

2001–2100 

|-bgcolor=#fefefe
| 2001 Einstein || 1973 EB ||  || March 5, 1973 || Zimmerwald || P. Wild || H || align=right | 4.0 km || 
|-id=002 bgcolor=#fefefe
| 2002 Euler ||  ||  || August 29, 1973 || Nauchnij || T. M. Smirnova || — || align=right | 20 km || 
|-id=003 bgcolor=#d6d6d6
| 2003 Harding || 6559 P-L ||  || September 24, 1960 || Palomar || PLS || THM || align=right | 20 km || 
|-id=004 bgcolor=#fefefe
| 2004 Lexell ||  ||  || September 22, 1973 || Nauchnij || N. S. Chernykh || — || align=right | 7.3 km || 
|-id=005 bgcolor=#E9E9E9
| 2005 Hencke || 1973 RA ||  || September 2, 1973 || Zimmerwald || P. Wild || EUN || align=right | 9.4 km || 
|-id=006 bgcolor=#fefefe
| 2006 Polonskaya ||  ||  || September 22, 1973 || Nauchnij || N. S. Chernykh || FLOmoon || align=right | 4.6 km || 
|-id=007 bgcolor=#fefefe
| 2007 McCuskey || 1963 SQ ||  || September 22, 1963 || Brooklyn || Indiana University || NYS || align=right | 26 km || 
|-id=008 bgcolor=#d6d6d6
| 2008 Konstitutsiya ||  ||  || September 27, 1973 || Nauchnij || L. I. Chernykh || — || align=right | 52 km || 
|-id=009 bgcolor=#d6d6d6
| 2009 Voloshina || 1968 UL ||  || October 22, 1968 || Nauchnij || T. M. Smirnova || THM || align=right | 27 km || 
|-id=010 bgcolor=#d6d6d6
| 2010 Chebyshev ||  ||  || October 13, 1969 || Nauchnij || B. A. Burnasheva || — || align=right | 25 km || 
|-id=011 bgcolor=#fefefe
| 2011 Veteraniya ||  ||  || August 30, 1970 || Nauchnij || T. M. Smirnova || V || align=right | 5.2 km || 
|-id=012 bgcolor=#fefefe
| 2012 Guo Shou-Jing ||  ||  || October 9, 1964 || Nanking || Purple Mountain Obs. || — || align=right | 12 km || 
|-id=013 bgcolor=#fefefe
| 2013 Tucapel ||  ||  || October 22, 1971 || Cerro El Roble || University of Chile || — || align=right | 11 km || 
|-id=014 bgcolor=#fefefe
| 2014 Vasilevskis || 1973 JA ||  || May 2, 1973 || Mount Hamilton || A. R. Klemola || PHO || align=right | 9.0 km || 
|-id=015 bgcolor=#fefefe
| 2015 Kachuevskaya ||  ||  || September 4, 1972 || Nauchnij || L. V. Zhuravleva || — || align=right | 12 km || 
|-id=016 bgcolor=#d6d6d6
| 2016 Heinemann || 1938 SE ||  || September 18, 1938 || Heidelberg || A. Bohrmann || THM || align=right | 22 km || 
|-id=017 bgcolor=#fefefe
| 2017 Wesson || A903 SC ||  || September 20, 1903 || Heidelberg || M. F. Wolf || FLO || align=right | 7.2 km || 
|-id=018 bgcolor=#fefefe
| 2018 Schuster || 1931 UC ||  || October 17, 1931 || Heidelberg || K. Reinmuth || — || align=right | 4.0 km || 
|-id=019 bgcolor=#fefefe
| 2019 van Albada ||  ||  || September 28, 1935 || Johannesburg || H. van Gent || FLOmoon || align=right | 7.9 km || 
|-id=020 bgcolor=#d6d6d6
| 2020 Ukko || 1936 FR ||  || March 18, 1936 || Turku || Y. Väisälä || EOS || align=right | 19 km || 
|-id=021 bgcolor=#fefefe
| 2021 Poincaré || 1936 MA ||  || June 26, 1936 || Algiers || L. Boyer || — || align=right | 5.0 km || 
|-id=022 bgcolor=#E9E9E9
| 2022 West || 1938 CK ||  || February 7, 1938 || Heidelberg || K. Reinmuth || — || align=right | 13 km || 
|-id=023 bgcolor=#d6d6d6
| 2023 Asaph || 1952 SA ||  || September 16, 1952 || Brooklyn || Indiana University || — || align=right | 20 km || 
|-id=024 bgcolor=#fefefe
| 2024 McLaughlin || 1952 UR ||  || October 23, 1952 || Brooklyn || Indiana University || V || align=right | 7.9 km || 
|-id=025 bgcolor=#d6d6d6
| 2025 Nortia || 1953 LG ||  || June 6, 1953 || Johannesburg || J. Churms || — || align=right | 43 km || 
|-id=026 bgcolor=#fefefe
| 2026 Cottrell || 1955 FF ||  || March 30, 1955 || Brooklyn || Indiana University || — || align=right | 14 km || 
|-id=027 bgcolor=#d6d6d6
| 2027 Shen Guo ||  ||  || November 9, 1964 || Nanking || Purple Mountain Obs. || EOS || align=right | 17 km || 
|-id=028 bgcolor=#fefefe
| 2028 Janequeo ||  ||  || July 18, 1968 || Cerro El Roble || C. Torres, S. Cofré || — || align=right | 3.2 km || 
|-id=029 bgcolor=#fefefe
| 2029 Binomi || 1969 RB ||  || September 11, 1969 || Zimmerwald || P. Wild || V || align=right | 6.9 km || 
|-id=030 bgcolor=#fefefe
| 2030 Belyaev ||  ||  || October 8, 1969 || Nauchnij || L. I. Chernykh || — || align=right | 5.9 km || 
|-id=031 bgcolor=#fefefe
| 2031 BAM ||  ||  || October 8, 1969 || Nauchnij || L. I. Chernykh || FLO || align=right | 6.2 km || 
|-id=032 bgcolor=#d6d6d6
| 2032 Ethel || 1970 OH ||  || July 30, 1970 || Nauchnij || T. M. Smirnova || — || align=right | 36 km || 
|-id=033 bgcolor=#fefefe
| 2033 Basilea || 1973 CA ||  || February 6, 1973 || Zimmerwald || P. Wild || — || align=right | 5.7 km || 
|-id=034 bgcolor=#fefefe
| 2034 Bernoulli || 1973 EE ||  || March 5, 1973 || Zimmerwald || P. Wild || — || align=right | 7.8 km || 
|-id=035 bgcolor=#FA8072
| 2035 Stearns || 1973 SC ||  || September 21, 1973 || El Leoncito || J. Gibson || H || align=right | 4.8 km || 
|-id=036 bgcolor=#fefefe
| 2036 Sheragul ||  ||  || September 22, 1973 || Nauchnij || N. S. Chernykh || — || align=right | 7.0 km || 
|-id=037 bgcolor=#fefefe
| 2037 Tripaxeptalis || 1973 UB ||  || October 25, 1973 || Zimmerwald || P. Wild || — || align=right | 6.0 km || 
|-id=038 bgcolor=#fefefe
| 2038 Bistro || 1973 WF ||  || November 24, 1973 || Zimmerwald || P. Wild || — || align=right | 11 km || 
|-id=039 bgcolor=#d6d6d6
| 2039 Payne-Gaposchkin || 1974 CA ||  || February 14, 1974 || Harvard Observatory || Harvard Obs. || THM || align=right | 14 km || 
|-id=040 bgcolor=#d6d6d6
| 2040 Chalonge || 1974 HA ||  || April 19, 1974 || Zimmerwald || P. Wild || MEL || align=right | 34 km || 
|-id=041 bgcolor=#d6d6d6
| 2041 Lancelot || 2523 P-L ||  || September 24, 1960 || Palomar || PLS || — || align=right | 17 km || 
|-id=042 bgcolor=#E9E9E9
| 2042 Sitarski || 4633 P-L ||  || September 24, 1960 || Palomar || PLS || MRX || align=right | 7.5 km || 
|-id=043 bgcolor=#d6d6d6
| 2043 Ortutay || 1936 TH ||  || November 12, 1936 || Konkoly || G. Kulin || — || align=right | 48 km || 
|-id=044 bgcolor=#FA8072
| 2044 Wirt || 1950 VE ||  || November 8, 1950 || Mount Hamilton || C. A. Wirtanen || moon || align=right | 6.7 km || 
|-id=045 bgcolor=#fefefe
| 2045 Peking ||  ||  || October 8, 1964 || Nanking || Purple Mountain Obs. || V || align=right | 9.7 km || 
|-id=046 bgcolor=#d6d6d6
| 2046 Leningrad ||  ||  || October 22, 1968 || Nauchnij || T. M. Smirnova || THM || align=right | 24 km || 
|-id=047 bgcolor=#fefefe
| 2047 Smetana ||  ||  || October 26, 1971 || Hamburg-Bergedorf || L. Kohoutek || Hmoon || align=right | 3.1 km || 
|-id=048 bgcolor=#fefefe
| 2048 Dwornik || 1973 QA ||  || August 27, 1973 || Palomar || E. F. Helin || H || align=right | 2.6 km || 
|-id=049 bgcolor=#fefefe
| 2049 Grietje || 1973 SH ||  || September 29, 1973 || Palomar || T. Gehrels || H || align=right | 2.5 km || 
|-id=050 bgcolor=#fefefe
| 2050 Francis || 1974 KA ||  || May 28, 1974 || Palomar || E. F. Helin || — || align=right | 8.5 km || 
|-id=051 bgcolor=#d6d6d6
| 2051 Chang || 1976 UC ||  || October 23, 1976 || Harvard Observatory || Harvard Obs. || KOR || align=right | 14 km || 
|-id=052 bgcolor=#d6d6d6
| 2052 Tamriko || 1976 UN ||  || October 24, 1976 || La Silla || R. M. West || EOS || align=right | 27 km || 
|-id=053 bgcolor=#E9E9E9
| 2053 Nuki || 1976 UO ||  || October 24, 1976 || La Silla || R. M. West || GEF || align=right | 11 km || 
|-id=054 bgcolor=#d6d6d6
| 2054 Gawain || 4097 P-L ||  || September 24, 1960 || Palomar || PLS || — || align=right | 18 km || 
|-id=055 bgcolor=#FA8072
| 2055 Dvořák || 1974 DB ||  || February 19, 1974 || Hamburg-Bergedorf || L. Kohoutek || — || align=right | 7.8 km || 
|-id=056 bgcolor=#fefefe
| 2056 Nancy || A909 TB ||  || October 15, 1909 || Heidelberg || J. Helffrich || slow || align=right | 7.8 km || 
|-id=057 bgcolor=#d6d6d6
| 2057 Rosemary || 1934 RQ ||  || September 7, 1934 || Heidelberg || K. Reinmuth || — || align=right | 13 km || 
|-id=058 bgcolor=#d6d6d6
| 2058 Róka || 1938 BH ||  || January 22, 1938 || Konkoly || G. Kulin || THM || align=right | 24 km || 
|-id=059 bgcolor=#FFC2E0
| 2059 Baboquivari || 1963 UA ||  || October 16, 1963 || Brooklyn || Indiana University || AMO +1km || align=right | 2.3 km || 
|-id=060 bgcolor=#C7FF8F
| 2060 Chiron || 1977 UB ||  || October 18, 1977 || Palomar || C. T. Kowal || centaur || align=right | 166 km || 
|-id=061 bgcolor=#FFC2E0
| 2061 Anza || 1960 UA ||  || October 22, 1960 || Flagstaff || H. L. Giclas || AMO +1km || align=right | 2.6 km || 
|-id=062 bgcolor=#FFC2E0
| 2062 Aten || 1976 AA ||  || January 7, 1976 || Palomar || E. F. Helin || ATE +1km || align=right | 1.1 km || 
|-id=063 bgcolor=#FFC2E0
| 2063 Bacchus || 1977 HB ||  || April 24, 1977 || Palomar || C. T. Kowal || APO +1km || align=right | 1.0 km || 
|-id=064 bgcolor=#FA8072
| 2064 Thomsen || 1942 RQ ||  || September 8, 1942 || Turku || L. Oterma || — || align=right | 14 km || 
|-id=065 bgcolor=#E9E9E9
| 2065 Spicer || 1959 RN ||  || September 9, 1959 || Brooklyn || Indiana University || — || align=right | 17 km || 
|-id=066 bgcolor=#fefefe
| 2066 Palala || 1934 LB ||  || June 4, 1934 || Johannesburg || C. Jackson || NYS || align=right | 17 km || 
|-id=067 bgcolor=#d6d6d6
| 2067 Aksnes || 1936 DD ||  || February 23, 1936 || Turku || Y. Väisälä || 3:2 || align=right | 46 km || 
|-id=068 bgcolor=#E9E9E9
| 2068 Dangreen || 1948 AD ||  || January 8, 1948 || Nice || M. Laugier || — || align=right | 34 km || 
|-id=069 bgcolor=#d6d6d6
| 2069 Hubble || 1955 FT ||  || March 29, 1955 || Brooklyn || Indiana University || — || align=right | 38 km || 
|-id=070 bgcolor=#fefefe
| 2070 Humason || 1964 TQ ||  || October 14, 1964 || Brooklyn || Indiana University || moon || align=right | 4.6 km || 
|-id=071 bgcolor=#fefefe
| 2071 Nadezhda || 1971 QS ||  || August 18, 1971 || Nauchnij || T. M. Smirnova || FLO || align=right | 5.0 km || 
|-id=072 bgcolor=#fefefe
| 2072 Kosmodemyanskaya ||  ||  || August 31, 1973 || Nauchnij || T. M. Smirnova || — || align=right | 4.8 km || 
|-id=073 bgcolor=#E9E9E9
| 2073 Janáček || 1974 DK ||  || February 19, 1974 || Hamburg-Bergedorf || L. Kohoutek || — || align=right | 9.8 km || 
|-id=074 bgcolor=#FA8072
| 2074 Shoemaker || 1974 UA ||  || October 17, 1974 || Palomar || E. F. Helin || — || align=right | 3.2 km || 
|-id=075 bgcolor=#fefefe
| 2075 Martinez || 1974 VA ||  || November 9, 1974 || El Leoncito || Félix Aguilar Obs. || — || align=right | 6.3 km || 
|-id=076 bgcolor=#fefefe
| 2076 Levin || 1974 WA ||  || November 16, 1974 || Harvard Observatory || Harvard Obs. || FLO || align=right | 3.6 km || 
|-id=077 bgcolor=#FA8072
| 2077 Kiangsu || 1974 YA ||  || December 18, 1974 || Nanking || Purple Mountain Obs. || slow || align=right | 3.8 km || 
|-id=078 bgcolor=#FA8072
| 2078 Nanking || 1975 AD ||  || January 12, 1975 || Nanking || Purple Mountain Obs. || — || align=right | 4.6 km || 
|-id=079 bgcolor=#E9E9E9
| 2079 Jacchia || 1976 DB ||  || February 23, 1976 || Harvard Observatory || Harvard Obs. || — || align=right | 8.9 km || 
|-id=080 bgcolor=#fefefe
| 2080 Jihlava || 1976 DG ||  || February 27, 1976 || Zimmerwald || P. Wild || — || align=right | 5.8 km || 
|-id=081 bgcolor=#fefefe
| 2081 Sázava || 1976 DH ||  || February 27, 1976 || Zimmerwald || P. Wild || NYS || align=right | 17 km || 
|-id=082 bgcolor=#d6d6d6
| 2082 Galahad || 7588 P-L ||  || October 17, 1960 || Palomar || PLS || — || align=right | 17 km || 
|-id=083 bgcolor=#fefefe
| 2083 Smither || 1973 WB ||  || November 29, 1973 || Palomar || E. F. Helin || H || align=right | 3.8 km || 
|-id=084 bgcolor=#fefefe
| 2084 Okayama || 1935 CK ||  || February 7, 1935 || Uccle || S. Arend || — || align=right | 18 km || 
|-id=085 bgcolor=#E9E9E9
| 2085 Henan || 1965 YA ||  || December 20, 1965 || Nanking || Purple Mountain Obs. || HEN || align=right | 13 km || 
|-id=086 bgcolor=#fefefe
| 2086 Newell || 1966 BC ||  || January 20, 1966 || Brooklyn || Indiana University || V || align=right | 6.1 km || 
|-id=087 bgcolor=#fefefe
| 2087 Kochera || 1975 YC ||  || December 28, 1975 || Zimmerwald || P. Wild || — || align=right | 6.6 km || 
|-id=088 bgcolor=#fefefe
| 2088 Sahlia || 1976 DJ ||  || February 27, 1976 || Zimmerwald || P. Wild || FLO || align=right | 7.4 km || 
|-id=089 bgcolor=#E9E9E9
| 2089 Cetacea || 1977 VF ||  || November 9, 1977 || Anderson Mesa || N. G. Thomas || — || align=right | 16 km || 
|-id=090 bgcolor=#d6d6d6
| 2090 Mizuho || 1978 EA ||  || March 12, 1978 || Yakiimo || T. Urata || — || align=right | 18 km || 
|-id=091 bgcolor=#d6d6d6
| 2091 Sampo || 1941 HO ||  || April 26, 1941 || Turku || Y. Väisälä || EOS || align=right | 23 km || 
|-id=092 bgcolor=#d6d6d6
| 2092 Sumiana || 1969 UP ||  || October 16, 1969 || Nauchnij || L. I. Chernykh || KOR || align=right | 14 km || 
|-id=093 bgcolor=#fefefe
| 2093 Genichesk || 1971 HX ||  || April 28, 1971 || Nauchnij || T. M. Smirnova || FLO || align=right | 7.9 km || 
|-id=094 bgcolor=#fefefe
| 2094 Magnitka ||  ||  || October 12, 1971 || Nauchnij || Crimean Astrophysical Obs. || FLO || align=right | 10 km || 
|-id=095 bgcolor=#E9E9E9
| 2095 Parsifal || 6036 P-L ||  || September 24, 1960 || Palomar || PLS || — || align=right | 9.2 km || 
|-id=096 bgcolor=#fefefe
| 2096 Väinö || 1939 UC ||  || October 18, 1939 || Turku || Y. Väisälä || — || align=right | 11 km || 
|-id=097 bgcolor=#d6d6d6
| 2097 Galle || 1953 PV ||  || August 11, 1953 || Heidelberg || K. Reinmuth || — || align=right | 26 km || 
|-id=098 bgcolor=#fefefe
| 2098 Zyskin || 1972 QE ||  || August 18, 1972 || Nauchnij || L. V. Zhuravleva || V || align=right | 13 km || 
|-id=099 bgcolor=#FA8072
| 2099 Öpik || 1977 VB ||  || November 8, 1977 || Palomar || E. F. Helin || — || align=right | 5.2 km || 
|-id=100 bgcolor=#FFC2E0
| 2100 Ra-Shalom || 1978 RA ||  || September 10, 1978 || Palomar || E. F. Helin || ATE +1km || align=right | 2.3 km || 
|}

2101–2200 

|-bgcolor=#FFC2E0
| 2101 Adonis || 1936 CA ||  || February 12, 1936 || Uccle || E. Delporte || APOPHA || align=right data-sort-value="0.6" | 600 m || 
|-id=102 bgcolor=#FFC2E0
| 2102 Tantalus || 1975 YA ||  || December 27, 1975 || Palomar || C. T. Kowal || APO +1kmPHA || align=right | 1.6 km || 
|-id=103 bgcolor=#d6d6d6
| 2103 Laverna || 1960 FL ||  || March 20, 1960 || La Plata Observatory || La Plata Obs. || — || align=right | 23 km || 
|-id=104 bgcolor=#d6d6d6
| 2104 Toronto || 1963 PD ||  || August 15, 1963 || Tautenburg Observatory || K. W. Kamper || — || align=right | 36 km || 
|-id=105 bgcolor=#fefefe
| 2105 Gudy || 1976 DA ||  || February 29, 1976 || La Silla || H.-E. Schuster || — || align=right | 20 km || 
|-id=106 bgcolor=#E9E9E9
| 2106 Hugo || 1936 UF ||  || October 21, 1936 || Nice || M. Laugier || — || align=right | 17 km || 
|-id=107 bgcolor=#E9E9E9
| 2107 Ilmari || 1941 VA ||  || November 12, 1941 || Turku || L. Oterma || — || align=right | 17 km || 
|-id=108 bgcolor=#fefefe
| 2108 Otto Schmidt ||  ||  || October 4, 1948 || Crimea-Simeis || P. F. Shajn || — || align=right | 29 km || 
|-id=109 bgcolor=#E9E9E9
| 2109 Dhotel ||  ||  || October 13, 1950 || Uccle || S. Arend || — || align=right | 20 km || 
|-id=110 bgcolor=#fefefe
| 2110 Moore-Sitterly || 1962 RD ||  || September 7, 1962 || Brooklyn || Indiana University || — || align=right | 5.7 km || 
|-id=111 bgcolor=#d6d6d6
| 2111 Tselina || 1969 LG ||  || June 13, 1969 || Nauchnij || T. M. Smirnova || EOS || align=right | 23 km || 
|-id=112 bgcolor=#fefefe
| 2112 Ulyanov || 1972 NP ||  || July 13, 1972 || Nauchnij || T. M. Smirnova || FLO || align=right | 7.5 km || 
|-id=113 bgcolor=#fefefe
| 2113 Ehrdni ||  ||  || September 11, 1972 || Nauchnij || N. S. Chernykh || — || align=right | 7.0 km || 
|-id=114 bgcolor=#d6d6d6
| 2114 Wallenquist || 1976 HA ||  || April 19, 1976 || Mount Stromlo || C.-I. Lagerkvist || THM || align=right | 23 km || 
|-id=115 bgcolor=#d6d6d6
| 2115 Irakli || 1976 UD ||  || October 24, 1976 || La Silla || R. M. West || — || align=right | 21 km || 
|-id=116 bgcolor=#E9E9E9
| 2116 Mtskheta || 1976 UM ||  || October 24, 1976 || La Silla || R. M. West || — || align=right | 23 km || 
|-id=117 bgcolor=#d6d6d6
| 2117 Danmark || 1978 AC ||  || January 9, 1978 || La Silla || R. M. West || KOR || align=right | 12 km || 
|-id=118 bgcolor=#E9E9E9
| 2118 Flagstaff || 1978 PB ||  || August 5, 1978 || Anderson Mesa || H. L. Giclas || — || align=right | 11 km || 
|-id=119 bgcolor=#fefefe
| 2119 Schwall || 1930 QG ||  || August 30, 1930 || Heidelberg || M. F. Wolf, M. Ferrero || FLO || align=right | 5.2 km || 
|-id=120 bgcolor=#d6d6d6
| 2120 Tyumenia || 1967 RM ||  || September 9, 1967 || Nauchnij || T. M. Smirnova || — || align=right | 51 km || 
|-id=121 bgcolor=#fefefe
| 2121 Sevastopol || 1971 ME ||  || June 27, 1971 || Nauchnij || T. M. Smirnova || FLOmoon || align=right | 8.7 km || 
|-id=122 bgcolor=#fefefe
| 2122 Pyatiletka || 1971 XB ||  || December 14, 1971 || Nauchnij || T. M. Smirnova || — || align=right | 11 km || 
|-id=123 bgcolor=#d6d6d6
| 2123 Vltava ||  ||  || September 22, 1973 || Nauchnij || N. S. Chernykh || KOR || align=right | 14 km || 
|-id=124 bgcolor=#d6d6d6
| 2124 Nissen || 1974 MK ||  || June 20, 1974 || El Leoncito || Félix Aguilar Obs. || EOS || align=right | 15 km || 
|-id=125 bgcolor=#E9E9E9
| 2125 Karl-Ontjes || 2005 P-L ||  || September 24, 1960 || Palomar || PLS || — || align=right | 11 km || 
|-id=126 bgcolor=#fefefe
| 2126 Gerasimovich || 1970 QZ ||  || August 30, 1970 || Nauchnij || T. M. Smirnova || — || align=right | 7.8 km || 
|-id=127 bgcolor=#d6d6d6
| 2127 Tanya ||  ||  || May 29, 1971 || Nauchnij || L. I. Chernykh || — || align=right | 38 km || 
|-id=128 bgcolor=#E9E9E9
| 2128 Wetherill || 1973 SB ||  || September 26, 1973 || Palomar || E. F. Helin || — || align=right | 8.9 km || 
|-id=129 bgcolor=#fefefe
| 2129 Cosicosi || 1973 SJ ||  || September 27, 1973 || Zimmerwald || P. Wild || FLO || align=right | 2.9 km || 
|-id=130 bgcolor=#fefefe
| 2130 Evdokiya ||  ||  || August 22, 1974 || Nauchnij || L. V. Zhuravleva || FLO || align=right | 5.4 km || 
|-id=131 bgcolor=#fefefe
| 2131 Mayall || 1975 RA ||  || September 3, 1975 || Mount Hamilton || A. R. Klemola || Hmoon || align=right | 8.3 km || 
|-id=132 bgcolor=#E9E9E9
| 2132 Zhukov ||  ||  || October 3, 1975 || Nauchnij || L. I. Chernykh || — || align=right | 31 km || 
|-id=133 bgcolor=#fefefe
| 2133 Franceswright || 1976 WB ||  || November 20, 1976 || Harvard Observatory || Harvard Obs. || — || align=right | 6.5 km || 
|-id=134 bgcolor=#E9E9E9
| 2134 Dennispalm || 1976 YB ||  || December 24, 1976 || Palomar || C. T. Kowal || — || align=right | 6.0 km || 
|-id=135 bgcolor=#FFC2E0
| 2135 Aristaeus || 1977 HA ||  || April 17, 1977 || Palomar || S. J. Bus, E. F. Helin || APO +1kmPHA || align=right data-sort-value="0.88" | 880 m || 
|-id=136 bgcolor=#d6d6d6
| 2136 Jugta || 1933 OC ||  || July 24, 1933 || Heidelberg || K. Reinmuth || EOS || align=right | 18 km || 
|-id=137 bgcolor=#d6d6d6
| 2137 Priscilla || 1936 QZ ||  || August 24, 1936 || Heidelberg || K. Reinmuth || — || align=right | 35 km || 
|-id=138 bgcolor=#E9E9E9
| 2138 Swissair || 1968 HB ||  || April 17, 1968 || Zimmerwald || P. Wild || — || align=right | 15 km || 
|-id=139 bgcolor=#fefefe
| 2139 Makharadze || 1970 MC ||  || June 30, 1970 || Nauchnij || T. M. Smirnova || NYS || align=right | 17 km || 
|-id=140 bgcolor=#d6d6d6
| 2140 Kemerovo || 1970 PE ||  || August 3, 1970 || Nauchnij || T. M. Smirnova || — || align=right | 35 km || 
|-id=141 bgcolor=#E9E9E9
| 2141 Simferopol ||  ||  || August 30, 1970 || Nauchnij || T. M. Smirnova || — || align=right | 12 km || 
|-id=142 bgcolor=#d6d6d6
| 2142 Landau || 1972 GA ||  || April 3, 1972 || Nauchnij || L. I. Chernykh || THM || align=right | 20 km || 
|-id=143 bgcolor=#fefefe
| 2143 Jimarnold || 1973 SA ||  || September 26, 1973 || Palomar || E. F. Helin || — || align=right | 4.9 km || 
|-id=144 bgcolor=#d6d6d6
| 2144 Marietta ||  ||  || January 18, 1975 || Nauchnij || L. I. Chernykh || KOR || align=right | 16 km || 
|-id=145 bgcolor=#d6d6d6
| 2145 Blaauw || 1976 UF ||  || October 24, 1976 || La Silla || R. M. West || URS || align=right | 41 km || 
|-id=146 bgcolor=#C2FFFF
| 2146 Stentor || 1976 UQ ||  || October 24, 1976 || La Silla || R. M. West || L4 || align=right | 51 km || 
|-id=147 bgcolor=#d6d6d6
| 2147 Kharadze || 1976 US ||  || October 25, 1976 || La Silla || R. M. West || VER || align=right | 23 km || 
|-id=148 bgcolor=#C2FFFF
| 2148 Epeios || 1976 UW ||  || October 24, 1976 || La Silla || R. M. West || L4 || align=right | 38 km || 
|-id=149 bgcolor=#E9E9E9
| 2149 Schwambraniya || 1977 FX ||  || March 22, 1977 || Nauchnij || N. S. Chernykh || — || align=right | 11 km || 
|-id=150 bgcolor=#fefefe
| 2150 Nyctimene || 1977 TA ||  || October 13, 1977 || Palomar || W. Sebok || H || align=right | 6.1 km || 
|-id=151 bgcolor=#E9E9E9
| 2151 Hadwiger || 1977 VX ||  || November 3, 1977 || Zimmerwald || P. Wild || MAR || align=right | 14 km || 
|-id=152 bgcolor=#d6d6d6
| 2152 Hannibal || 1978 WK ||  || November 19, 1978 || Zimmerwald || P. Wild || MEL || align=right | 45 km || 
|-id=153 bgcolor=#d6d6d6
| 2153 Akiyama || 1978 XD ||  || December 1, 1978 || Harvard Observatory || Harvard Obs. || THM || align=right | 23 km || 
|-id=154 bgcolor=#E9E9E9
| 2154 Underhill || 2015 P-L ||  || September 24, 1960 || Palomar || PLS || — || align=right | 13 km || 
|-id=155 bgcolor=#d6d6d6
| 2155 Wodan || 6542 P-L ||  || September 24, 1960 || Palomar || PLS || KOR || align=right | 8.5 km || 
|-id=156 bgcolor=#fefefe
| 2156 Kate || A917 SH ||  || September 23, 1917 || Crimea-Simeis || S. Belyavskyj || — || align=right | 8.1 km || 
|-id=157 bgcolor=#E9E9E9
| 2157 Ashbrook || A924 EF ||  || March 7, 1924 || Heidelberg || K. Reinmuth || GEF || align=right | 13 km || 
|-id=158 bgcolor=#d6d6d6
| 2158 Tietjen || 1933 OS ||  || July 24, 1933 || Heidelberg || K. Reinmuth || — || align=right | 23 km || 
|-id=159 bgcolor=#fefefe
| 2159 Kukkamäki || 1941 UX ||  || October 16, 1941 || Turku || L. Oterma || — || align=right | 11 km || 
|-id=160 bgcolor=#d6d6d6
| 2160 Spitzer || 1956 RL ||  || September 7, 1956 || Brooklyn || Indiana University || KOR || align=right | 14 km || 
|-id=161 bgcolor=#E9E9E9
| 2161 Grissom || 1963 UD ||  || October 17, 1963 || Brooklyn || Indiana University || — || align=right | 16 km || 
|-id=162 bgcolor=#fefefe
| 2162 Anhui || 1966 BE ||  || January 30, 1966 || Nanking || Purple Mountain Obs. || — || align=right | 7.3 km || 
|-id=163 bgcolor=#d6d6d6
| 2163 Korczak ||  ||  || September 16, 1971 || Nauchnij || Crimean Astrophysical Obs. || THM || align=right | 24 km || 
|-id=164 bgcolor=#d6d6d6
| 2164 Lyalya ||  ||  || September 11, 1972 || Nauchnij || N. S. Chernykh || THM || align=right | 20 km || 
|-id=165 bgcolor=#d6d6d6
| 2165 Young || 1956 RJ ||  || September 7, 1956 || Brooklyn || Indiana University || THM || align=right | 27 km || 
|-id=166 bgcolor=#fefefe
| 2166 Handahl || 1936 QB ||  || August 13, 1936 || Crimea-Simeis || G. N. Neujmin || — || align=right | 4.3 km || 
|-id=167 bgcolor=#E9E9E9
| 2167 Erin || 1971 LA ||  || June 1, 1971 || Bickley || Perth Obs. || — || align=right | 9.0 km || 
|-id=168 bgcolor=#fefefe
| 2168 Swope ||  ||  || September 14, 1955 || Brooklyn || Indiana University || — || align=right | 8.2 km || 
|-id=169 bgcolor=#E9E9E9
| 2169 Taiwan ||  ||  || November 9, 1964 || Nanking || Purple Mountain Obs. || AST || align=right | 19 km || 
|-id=170 bgcolor=#fefefe
| 2170 Byelorussia || 1971 SZ ||  || September 16, 1971 || Nauchnij || Crimean Astrophysical Obs. || NYS || align=right | 9.4 km || 
|-id=171 bgcolor=#fefefe
| 2171 Kiev ||  ||  || August 28, 1973 || Nauchnij || T. M. Smirnova || FLOmoon || align=right | 8.0 km || 
|-id=172 bgcolor=#d6d6d6
| 2172 Plavsk ||  ||  || August 31, 1973 || Nauchnij || T. M. Smirnova || — || align=right | 19 km || 
|-id=173 bgcolor=#d6d6d6
| 2173 Maresjev ||  ||  || August 22, 1974 || Nauchnij || L. V. Zhuravleva || — || align=right | 28 km || 
|-id=174 bgcolor=#E9E9E9
| 2174 Asmodeus || 1975 TA ||  || October 8, 1975 || Palomar || S. J. Bus, J. Huchra || — || align=right | 5.2 km || 
|-id=175 bgcolor=#fefefe
| 2175 Andrea Doria || 1977 TY ||  || October 12, 1977 || Zimmerwald || P. Wild || — || align=right | 3.9 km || 
|-id=176 bgcolor=#d6d6d6
| 2176 Donar || 2529 P-L ||  || September 24, 1960 || Palomar || PLS || KOR || align=right | 11 km || 
|-id=177 bgcolor=#d6d6d6
| 2177 Oliver || 6551 P-L ||  || September 24, 1960 || Palomar || PLS || — || align=right | 20 km || 
|-id=178 bgcolor=#fefefe
| 2178 Kazakhstania ||  ||  || September 11, 1972 || Nauchnij || N. S. Chernykh || moon || align=right | 4.3 km || 
|-id=179 bgcolor=#d6d6d6
| 2179 Platzeck || 1965 MA ||  || June 28, 1965 || El Leoncito || A. R. Klemola || EOS || align=right | 20 km || 
|-id=180 bgcolor=#d6d6d6
| 2180 Marjaleena || 1940 RJ ||  || September 8, 1940 || Turku || H. Alikoski || EOS || align=right | 21 km || 
|-id=181 bgcolor=#E9E9E9
| 2181 Fogelin || 1942 YA ||  || December 28, 1942 || Heidelberg || K. Reinmuth || EUN || align=right | 10 km || 
|-id=182 bgcolor=#d6d6d6
| 2182 Semirot ||  ||  || March 21, 1953 || Brooklyn || Indiana University || THM || align=right | 24 km || 
|-id=183 bgcolor=#d6d6d6
| 2183 Neufang || 1959 OB ||  || July 26, 1959 || Bloemfontein || C. Hoffmeister || — || align=right | 24 km || 
|-id=184 bgcolor=#d6d6d6
| 2184 Fujian ||  ||  || October 9, 1964 || Nanking || Purple Mountain Obs. || — || align=right | 36 km || 
|-id=185 bgcolor=#E9E9E9
| 2185 Guangdong || 1965 WO ||  || November 20, 1965 || Nanking || Purple Mountain Obs. || GEF || align=right | 15 km || 
|-id=186 bgcolor=#E9E9E9
| 2186 Keldysh ||  ||  || September 27, 1973 || Nauchnij || L. I. Chernykh || — || align=right | 13 km || 
|-id=187 bgcolor=#E9E9E9
| 2187 La Silla || 1976 UH ||  || October 24, 1976 || La Silla || R. M. West || — || align=right | 12 km || 
|-id=188 bgcolor=#d6d6d6
| 2188 Orlenok ||  ||  || October 28, 1976 || Nauchnij || L. V. Zhuravleva || KOR || align=right | 14 km || 
|-id=189 bgcolor=#fefefe
| 2189 Zaragoza || 1975 QK ||  || August 30, 1975 || El Leoncito || Félix Aguilar Obs. || — || align=right | 6.3 km || 
|-id=190 bgcolor=#fefefe
| 2190 Coubertin ||  ||  || April 2, 1976 || Nauchnij || N. S. Chernykh || — || align=right | 15 km || 
|-id=191 bgcolor=#d6d6d6
| 2191 Uppsala ||  ||  || August 6, 1977 || Mount Stromlo || C.-I. Lagerkvist || EOS || align=right | 18 km || 
|-id=192 bgcolor=#d6d6d6
| 2192 Pyatigoriya || 1972 HP ||  || April 18, 1972 || Nauchnij || T. M. Smirnova || — || align=right | 29 km || 
|-id=193 bgcolor=#d6d6d6
| 2193 Jackson || 1926 KB ||  || May 18, 1926 || Johannesburg || H. E. Wood || — || align=right | 58 km || 
|-id=194 bgcolor=#fefefe
| 2194 Arpola || 1940 GE ||  || April 3, 1940 || Turku || Y. Väisälä || — || align=right | 9.0 km || 
|-id=195 bgcolor=#fefefe
| 2195 Tengström ||  ||  || September 27, 1941 || Turku || L. Oterma || — || align=right | 8.6 km || 
|-id=196 bgcolor=#d6d6d6
| 2196 Ellicott || 1965 BC ||  || January 29, 1965 || Brooklyn || Indiana University || 7:4 || align=right | 57 km || 
|-id=197 bgcolor=#d6d6d6
| 2197 Shanghai || 1965 YN ||  || December 30, 1965 || Nanking || Purple Mountain Obs. || THM || align=right | 20 km || 
|-id=198 bgcolor=#E9E9E9
| 2198 Ceplecha || 1975 VF ||  || November 7, 1975 || Harvard Observatory || Harvard Obs. || — || align=right | 3.8 km || 
|-id=199 bgcolor=#fefefe
| 2199 Kleť || 1978 LA ||  || June 6, 1978 || Kleť || A. Mrkos || — || align=right | 7.0 km || 
|-id=200 bgcolor=#fefefe
| 2200 Pasadena || 6090 P-L ||  || September 24, 1960 || Palomar || PLS || — || align=right | 8.1 km || 
|}

2201–2300 

|-bgcolor=#FFC2E0
| 2201 Oljato || 1947 XC ||  || December 12, 1947 || Flagstaff || H. L. Giclas || APO +1kmPHA || align=right | 1.8 km || 
|-id=202 bgcolor=#FFC2E0
| 2202 Pele || 1972 RA ||  || September 7, 1972 || Mount Hamilton || A. R. Klemola || AMO +1km || align=right | 1.3 km || 
|-id=203 bgcolor=#d6d6d6
| 2203 van Rhijn ||  ||  || September 28, 1935 || Johannesburg || H. van Gent || THM || align=right | 22 km || 
|-id=204 bgcolor=#FA8072
| 2204 Lyyli || 1943 EQ ||  || March 3, 1943 || Turku || Y. Väisälä || — || align=right | 25 km || 
|-id=205 bgcolor=#d6d6d6
| 2205 Glinka ||  ||  || September 27, 1973 || Nauchnij || L. I. Chernykh || — || align=right | 14 km || 
|-id=206 bgcolor=#d6d6d6
| 2206 Gabrova ||  ||  || April 1, 1976 || Nauchnij || N. S. Chernykh || EOS || align=right | 20 km || 
|-id=207 bgcolor=#C2FFFF
| 2207 Antenor ||  ||  || August 19, 1977 || Nauchnij || N. S. Chernykh || L5 || align=right | 98 km || 
|-id=208 bgcolor=#d6d6d6
| 2208 Pushkin ||  ||  || August 22, 1977 || Nauchnij || N. S. Chernykh || 7:4 || align=right | 41 km || 
|-id=209 bgcolor=#d6d6d6
| 2209 Tianjin ||  ||  || October 28, 1978 || Nanking || Purple Mountain Obs. || KOR || align=right | 17 km || 
|-id=210 bgcolor=#fefefe
| 2210 Lois || 9597 P-L ||  || September 24, 1960 || Palomar || PLS || NYS || align=right | 4.5 km || 
|-id=211 bgcolor=#d6d6d6
| 2211 Hanuman ||  ||  || November 26, 1951 || Mount Wilson || L. E. Cunningham || URS || align=right | 18 km || 
|-id=212 bgcolor=#FFC2E0
| 2212 Hephaistos || 1978 SB ||  || September 27, 1978 || Nauchnij || L. I. Chernykh || APO +1km || align=right | 5.7 km || 
|-id=213 bgcolor=#fefefe
| 2213 Meeus ||  ||  || September 24, 1935 || Uccle || E. Delporte || — || align=right | 4.9 km || 
|-id=214 bgcolor=#d6d6d6
| 2214 Carol || 1953 GF ||  || April 7, 1953 || Heidelberg || K. Reinmuth || — || align=right | 26 km || 
|-id=215 bgcolor=#E9E9E9
| 2215 Sichuan ||  ||  || November 12, 1964 || Nanking || Purple Mountain Obs. || — || align=right | 13 km || 
|-id=216 bgcolor=#d6d6d6
| 2216 Kerch || 1971 LF ||  || June 12, 1971 || Nauchnij || T. M. Smirnova || EOS || align=right | 18 km || 
|-id=217 bgcolor=#d6d6d6
| 2217 Eltigen ||  ||  || September 26, 1971 || Nauchnij || T. M. Smirnova || THM || align=right | 29 km || 
|-id=218 bgcolor=#d6d6d6
| 2218 Wotho || 1975 AK ||  || January 10, 1975 || Zimmerwald || P. Wild || — || align=right | 28 km || 
|-id=219 bgcolor=#d6d6d6
| 2219 Mannucci || 1975 LU ||  || June 13, 1975 || El Leoncito || Félix Aguilar Obs. || — || align=right | 39 km || 
|-id=220 bgcolor=#d6d6d6
| 2220 Hicks || 1975 VB ||  || November 4, 1975 || Palomar || E. F. Helin || THM || align=right | 16 km || 
|-id=221 bgcolor=#E9E9E9
| 2221 Chilton || 1976 QC ||  || August 25, 1976 || Harvard Observatory || Harvard Obs. || MAR || align=right | 6.7 km || 
|-id=222 bgcolor=#d6d6d6
| 2222 Lermontov ||  ||  || September 19, 1977 || Nauchnij || N. S. Chernykh || THM || align=right | 30 km || 
|-id=223 bgcolor=#C2FFFF
| 2223 Sarpedon ||  ||  || October 4, 1977 || Nanking || Purple Mountain Obs. || L5 || align=right | 77 km || 
|-id=224 bgcolor=#d6d6d6
| 2224 Tucson || 2528 P-L ||  || September 24, 1960 || Palomar || PLS || KOR || align=right | 23 km || 
|-id=225 bgcolor=#d6d6d6
| 2225 Serkowski || 6546 P-L ||  || September 24, 1960 || Palomar || PLS || KOR || align=right | 10 km || 
|-id=226 bgcolor=#d6d6d6
| 2226 Cunitza ||  ||  || August 26, 1936 || Heidelberg || A. Bohrmann || KAR || align=right | 15 km || 
|-id=227 bgcolor=#fefefe
| 2227 Otto Struve || 1955 RX ||  || September 13, 1955 || Brooklyn || Indiana University || — || align=right | 4.7 km || 
|-id=228 bgcolor=#d6d6d6
| 2228 Soyuz-Apollo || 1977 OH ||  || July 19, 1977 || Nauchnij || N. S. Chernykh || THM || align=right | 26 km || 
|-id=229 bgcolor=#E9E9E9
| 2229 Mezzarco || 1977 RO ||  || September 7, 1977 || Zimmerwald || P. Wild || — || align=right | 8.8 km || 
|-id=230 bgcolor=#d6d6d6
| 2230 Yunnan ||  ||  || October 29, 1978 || Nanking || Purple Mountain Obs. || KOR || align=right | 11 km || 
|-id=231 bgcolor=#E9E9E9
| 2231 Durrell || 1941 SG ||  || September 21, 1941 || Uccle || S. Arend || — || align=right | 16 km || 
|-id=232 bgcolor=#E9E9E9
| 2232 Altaj ||  ||  || September 15, 1969 || Nauchnij || B. A. Burnasheva || — || align=right | 12 km || 
|-id=233 bgcolor=#fefefe
| 2233 Kuznetsov ||  ||  || December 3, 1972 || Nauchnij || L. V. Zhuravleva || — || align=right | 6.7 km || 
|-id=234 bgcolor=#E9E9E9
| 2234 Schmadel || 1977 HD ||  || April 27, 1977 || La Silla || H.-E. Schuster || — || align=right | 9.5 km || 
|-id=235 bgcolor=#d6d6d6
| 2235 Vittore || A924 GA ||  || April 5, 1924 || Heidelberg || K. Reinmuth || — || align=right | 42 km || 
|-id=236 bgcolor=#fefefe
| 2236 Austrasia || 1933 FX ||  || March 23, 1933 || Heidelberg || K. Reinmuth || — || align=right | 9.1 km || 
|-id=237 bgcolor=#d6d6d6
| 2237 Melnikov || 1938 TB ||  || October 2, 1938 || Crimea-Simeis || G. N. Neujmin || THM || align=right | 21 km || 
|-id=238 bgcolor=#d6d6d6
| 2238 Steshenko ||  ||  || September 11, 1972 || Nauchnij || N. S. Chernykh || THM || align=right | 15 km || 
|-id=239 bgcolor=#d6d6d6
| 2239 Paracelsus || 1978 RC ||  || September 13, 1978 || Zimmerwald || P. Wild || — || align=right | 34 km || 
|-id=240 bgcolor=#d6d6d6
| 2240 Tsai || 1978 YA ||  || December 30, 1978 || Harvard Observatory || Harvard Obs. || — || align=right | 24 km || 
|-id=241 bgcolor=#C2FFFF
| 2241 Alcathous || 1979 WM ||  || November 22, 1979 || Palomar || C. T. Kowal || L5 || align=right | 114 km || 
|-id=242 bgcolor=#fefefe
| 2242 Balaton || 1936 TG ||  || October 13, 1936 || Konkoly || G. Kulin || moon || align=right | 5.8 km || 
|-id=243 bgcolor=#fefefe
| 2243 Lönnrot ||  ||  || September 25, 1941 || Turku || Y. Väisälä || FLO || align=right | 8.6 km || 
|-id=244 bgcolor=#E9E9E9
| 2244 Tesla ||  ||  || October 22, 1952 || Belgrade || M. B. Protić || — || align=right | 24 km || 
|-id=245 bgcolor=#E9E9E9
| 2245 Hekatostos || 1968 BC ||  || January 24, 1968 || Nauchnij || L. I. Chernykh || — || align=right | 29 km || 
|-id=246 bgcolor=#d6d6d6
| 2246 Bowell || 1979 XH ||  || December 14, 1979 || Anderson Mesa || E. Bowell || 3:2 || align=right | 48 km || 
|-id=247 bgcolor=#fefefe
| 2247 Hiroshima || 6512 P-L ||  || September 24, 1960 || Palomar || PLS || — || align=right | 4.4 km || 
|-id=248 bgcolor=#d6d6d6
| 2248 Kanda || 1933 DE ||  || February 27, 1933 || Heidelberg || K. Reinmuth || THM || align=right | 26 km || 
|-id=249 bgcolor=#d6d6d6
| 2249 Yamamoto || 1942 GA ||  || April 6, 1942 || Heidelberg || K. Reinmuth || — || align=right | 34 km || 
|-id=250 bgcolor=#d6d6d6
| 2250 Stalingrad || 1972 HN ||  || April 18, 1972 || Nauchnij || T. M. Smirnova || THM || align=right | 19 km || 
|-id=251 bgcolor=#E9E9E9
| 2251 Tikhov ||  ||  || September 19, 1977 || Nauchnij || N. S. Chernykh || — || align=right | 29 km || 
|-id=252 bgcolor=#E9E9E9
| 2252 CERGA || 1978 VT ||  || November 1, 1978 || Caussols || K. Tomita || — || align=right | 18 km || 
|-id=253 bgcolor=#FA8072
| 2253 Espinette || 1932 PB ||  || July 30, 1932 || Williams Bay || G. Van Biesbroeck || — || align=right | 5.5 km || 
|-id=254 bgcolor=#fefefe
| 2254 Requiem ||  ||  || August 19, 1977 || Nauchnij || N. S. Chernykh || — || align=right | 9.6 km || 
|-id=255 bgcolor=#d6d6d6
| 2255 Qinghai ||  ||  || November 3, 1977 || Nanking || Purple Mountain Obs. || — || align=right | 24 km || 
|-id=256 bgcolor=#d6d6d6
| 2256 Wiśniewski || 4519 P-L ||  || September 24, 1960 || Palomar || PLS || THM || align=right | 17 km || 
|-id=257 bgcolor=#fefefe
| 2257 Kaarina || 1939 QB ||  || August 18, 1939 || Turku || H. Alikoski || — || align=right | 5.7 km || 
|-id=258 bgcolor=#E9E9E9
| 2258 Viipuri || 1939 TA ||  || October 7, 1939 || Turku || Y. Väisälä || — || align=right | 26 km || 
|-id=259 bgcolor=#fefefe
| 2259 Sofievka || 1971 OG ||  || July 19, 1971 || Nauchnij || B. A. Burnasheva || FLO || align=right | 17 km || 
|-id=260 bgcolor=#C2FFFF
| 2260 Neoptolemus ||  ||  || November 26, 1975 || Nanking || Purple Mountain Obs. || L4 || align=right | 76 km || 
|-id=261 bgcolor=#fefefe
| 2261 Keeler || 1977 HC ||  || April 20, 1977 || Mount Hamilton || A. R. Klemola || PHO || align=right | 7.3 km || 
|-id=262 bgcolor=#E9E9E9
| 2262 Mitidika || 1978 RB ||  || September 10, 1978 || Zimmerwald || P. Wild || — || align=right | 8.8 km || 
|-id=263 bgcolor=#d6d6d6
| 2263 Shaanxi ||  ||  || October 30, 1978 || Nanking || Purple Mountain Obs. || EOS || align=right | 27 km || 
|-id=264 bgcolor=#d6d6d6
| 2264 Sabrina || 1979 YK ||  || December 16, 1979 || Anderson Mesa || E. Bowell || THM || align=right | 34 km || 
|-id=265 bgcolor=#E9E9E9
| 2265 Verbaandert || 1950 DB ||  || February 17, 1950 || Uccle || S. Arend || — || align=right | 12 km || 
|-id=266 bgcolor=#d6d6d6
| 2266 Tchaikovsky || 1974 VK ||  || November 12, 1974 || Nauchnij || L. I. Chernykh || 7:4 || align=right | 47 km || 
|-id=267 bgcolor=#fefefe
| 2267 Agassiz || 1977 RF ||  || September 9, 1977 || Harvard Observatory || Harvard Obs. || — || align=right | 5.1 km || 
|-id=268 bgcolor=#d6d6d6
| 2268 Szmytowna || 1942 VW ||  || November 6, 1942 || Turku || L. Oterma || KOR || align=right | 13 km || 
|-id=269 bgcolor=#d6d6d6
| 2269 Efremiana ||  ||  || May 2, 1976 || Nauchnij || N. S. Chernykh || — || align=right | 30 km || 
|-id=270 bgcolor=#d6d6d6
| 2270 Yazhi || 1980 ED ||  || March 14, 1980 || Anderson Mesa || E. Bowell || THM || align=right | 26 km || 
|-id=271 bgcolor=#E9E9E9
| 2271 Kiso ||  ||  || October 22, 1976 || Kiso || H. Kosai, K. Furukawa || HEN || align=right | 31 km || 
|-id=272 bgcolor=#fefefe
| 2272 Montezuma || 1972 FA ||  || March 16, 1972 || Palomar || T. Gehrels || H || align=right | 5.3 km || 
|-id=273 bgcolor=#fefefe
| 2273 Yarilo ||  ||  || March 6, 1975 || Nauchnij || L. I. Chernykh || — || align=right | 5.6 km || 
|-id=274 bgcolor=#fefefe
| 2274 Ehrsson || 1976 EA ||  || March 2, 1976 || Kvistaberg || C.-I. Lagerkvist || — || align=right | 7.7 km || 
|-id=275 bgcolor=#fefefe
| 2275 Cuitlahuac || 1979 MH ||  || June 16, 1979 || La Silla || H.-E. Schuster || — || align=right | 7.0 km || 
|-id=276 bgcolor=#fefefe
| 2276 Warck || 1933 QA ||  || August 18, 1933 || Uccle || E. Delporte || NYS || align=right | 15 km || 
|-id=277 bgcolor=#E9E9E9
| 2277 Moreau || 1950 DS ||  || February 18, 1950 || Uccle || S. Arend || — || align=right | 12 km || 
|-id=278 bgcolor=#fefefe
| 2278 Götz || 1953 GE ||  || April 7, 1953 || Heidelberg || K. Reinmuth || — || align=right | 12 km || 
|-id=279 bgcolor=#fefefe
| 2279 Barto || 1968 DL ||  || February 25, 1968 || Nauchnij || L. I. Chernykh || NYS || align=right | 14 km || 
|-id=280 bgcolor=#fefefe
| 2280 Kunikov ||  ||  || September 26, 1971 || Nauchnij || T. M. Smirnova || — || align=right | 6.1 km || 
|-id=281 bgcolor=#fefefe
| 2281 Biela ||  ||  || October 26, 1971 || Hamburg-Bergedorf || L. Kohoutek || — || align=right | 6.1 km || 
|-id=282 bgcolor=#fefefe
| 2282 Andrés Bello || 1974 FE ||  || March 22, 1974 || Cerro El Roble || C. Torres || FLO || align=right | 5.3 km || 
|-id=283 bgcolor=#fefefe
| 2283 Bunke ||  ||  || September 26, 1974 || Nauchnij || L. V. Zhuravleva || — || align=right | 6.0 km || 
|-id=284 bgcolor=#fefefe
| 2284 San Juan ||  ||  || October 10, 1974 || El Leoncito || Félix Aguilar Obs. || — || align=right | 8.8 km || 
|-id=285 bgcolor=#fefefe
| 2285 Ron Helin || 1976 QB ||  || August 27, 1976 || Palomar || S. J. Bus || FLO || align=right | 3.7 km || 
|-id=286 bgcolor=#fefefe
| 2286 Fesenkov || 1977 NH ||  || July 14, 1977 || Nauchnij || N. S. Chernykh || — || align=right | 6.7 km || 
|-id=287 bgcolor=#fefefe
| 2287 Kalmykia ||  ||  || August 22, 1977 || Nauchnij || N. S. Chernykh || FLO || align=right | 6.9 km || 
|-id=288 bgcolor=#d6d6d6
| 2288 Karolinum || 1979 UZ ||  || October 19, 1979 || Kleť || L. Brožek || — || align=right | 19 km || 
|-id=289 bgcolor=#E9E9E9
| 2289 McMillan || 6567 P-L ||  || September 24, 1960 || Palomar || PLS || MIS || align=right | 12 km || 
|-id=290 bgcolor=#E9E9E9
| 2290 Helffrich ||  ||  || February 14, 1932 || Heidelberg || K. Reinmuth || — || align=right | 17 km || 
|-id=291 bgcolor=#d6d6d6
| 2291 Kevo || 1941 FS ||  || March 19, 1941 || Turku || L. Oterma || — || align=right | 41 km || 
|-id=292 bgcolor=#E9E9E9
| 2292 Seili || 1942 RM ||  || September 7, 1942 || Turku || Y. Väisälä || — || align=right | 11 km || 
|-id=293 bgcolor=#d6d6d6
| 2293 Guernica ||  ||  || March 13, 1977 || Nauchnij || N. S. Chernykh || THM || align=right | 27 km || 
|-id=294 bgcolor=#E9E9E9
| 2294 Andronikov ||  ||  || August 14, 1977 || Nauchnij || N. S. Chernykh || — || align=right | 15 km || 
|-id=295 bgcolor=#d6d6d6
| 2295 Matusovskij ||  ||  || August 19, 1977 || Nauchnij || N. S. Chernykh || — || align=right | 21 km || 
|-id=296 bgcolor=#d6d6d6
| 2296 Kugultinov ||  ||  || January 18, 1975 || Nauchnij || L. I. Chernykh || THM || align=right | 22 km || 
|-id=297 bgcolor=#d6d6d6
| 2297 Daghestan || 1978 RE ||  || September 1, 1978 || Nauchnij || N. S. Chernykh || THM || align=right | 27 km || 
|-id=298 bgcolor=#fefefe
| 2298 Cindijon || A915 TA ||  || October 2, 1915 || Heidelberg || M. F. Wolf || — || align=right | 6.2 km || 
|-id=299 bgcolor=#E9E9E9
| 2299 Hanko || 1941 SZ ||  || September 25, 1941 || Turku || Y. Väisälä || — || align=right | 6.5 km || 
|-id=300 bgcolor=#d6d6d6
| 2300 Stebbins ||  ||  || October 10, 1953 || Brooklyn || Indiana University || KOR || align=right | 12 km || 
|}

2301–2400 

|-bgcolor=#d6d6d6
| 2301 Whitford || 1965 WJ ||  || November 20, 1965 || Brooklyn || Indiana University || — || align=right | 17 km || 
|-id=302 bgcolor=#E9E9E9
| 2302 Florya ||  ||  || October 2, 1972 || Nauchnij || N. E. Kuročkin || EUN || align=right | 11 km || 
|-id=303 bgcolor=#d6d6d6
| 2303 Retsina || 1979 FK ||  || March 24, 1979 || Zimmerwald || P. Wild || — || align=right | 14 km || 
|-id=304 bgcolor=#E9E9E9
| 2304 Slavia || 1979 KB ||  || May 18, 1979 || Kleť || A. Mrkos || EUN || align=right | 12 km || 
|-id=305 bgcolor=#E9E9E9
| 2305 King ||  ||  || September 12, 1980 || Harvard Observatory || Harvard Obs. || — || align=right | 13 km || 
|-id=306 bgcolor=#E9E9E9
| 2306 Bauschinger || 1939 PM ||  || August 15, 1939 || Heidelberg || K. Reinmuth || PAD || align=right | 19 km || 
|-id=307 bgcolor=#d6d6d6
| 2307 Garuda || 1957 HJ ||  || April 18, 1957 || La Plata Observatory || La Plata Obs. || — || align=right | 40 km || 
|-id=308 bgcolor=#E9E9E9
| 2308 Schilt || 1967 JM ||  || May 6, 1967 || El Leoncito || C. U. Cesco, A. R. Klemola || — || align=right | 18 km || 
|-id=309 bgcolor=#d6d6d6
| 2309 Mr. Spock ||  ||  || August 16, 1971 || El Leoncito || J. Gibson || EOS || align=right | 20 km || 
|-id=310 bgcolor=#d6d6d6
| 2310 Olshaniya ||  ||  || September 26, 1974 || Nauchnij || L. V. Zhuravleva || THM || align=right | 26 km || 
|-id=311 bgcolor=#d6d6d6
| 2311 El Leoncito ||  ||  || October 10, 1974 || El Leoncito || Félix Aguilar Obs. || 7:4 || align=right | 53 km || 
|-id=312 bgcolor=#d6d6d6
| 2312 Duboshin ||  ||  || April 1, 1976 || Nauchnij || N. S. Chernykh || 3:2 || align=right | 50 km || 
|-id=313 bgcolor=#fefefe
| 2313 Aruna || 1976 TA ||  || October 15, 1976 || Anderson Mesa || H. L. Giclas || NYS || align=right | 15 km || 
|-id=314 bgcolor=#fefefe
| 2314 Field || 1977 VD ||  || November 12, 1977 || Harvard Observatory || Harvard Obs. || — || align=right | 3.8 km || 
|-id=315 bgcolor=#d6d6d6
| 2315 Czechoslovakia || 1980 DZ ||  || February 19, 1980 || Kleť || Z. Vávrová || EOS || align=right | 25 km || 
|-id=316 bgcolor=#fefefe
| 2316 Jo-Ann || 1980 RH ||  || September 2, 1980 || Anderson Mesa || E. Bowell || MAS || align=right | 13 km || 
|-id=317 bgcolor=#E9E9E9
| 2317 Galya || 2524 P-L ||  || September 24, 1960 || Palomar || PLS || — || align=right | 6.5 km || 
|-id=318 bgcolor=#fefefe
| 2318 Lubarsky || 6521 P-L ||  || September 24, 1960 || Palomar || PLS || FLO || align=right | 4.7 km || 
|-id=319 bgcolor=#d6d6d6
| 2319 Aristides || 7631 P-L ||  || October 17, 1960 || Palomar || PLS || KOR || align=right | 11 km || 
|-id=320 bgcolor=#d6d6d6
| 2320 Blarney || 1979 QJ ||  || August 29, 1979 || Zimmerwald || P. Wild || — || align=right | 36 km || 
|-id=321 bgcolor=#d6d6d6
| 2321 Lužnice ||  ||  || February 19, 1980 || Kleť || Z. Vávrová || — || align=right | 22 km || 
|-id=322 bgcolor=#fefefe
| 2322 Kitt Peak ||  ||  || October 28, 1954 || Brooklyn || Indiana University || — || align=right | 16 km || 
|-id=323 bgcolor=#d6d6d6
| 2323 Zverev ||  ||  || September 24, 1976 || Nauchnij || N. S. Chernykh || — || align=right | 22 km || 
|-id=324 bgcolor=#d6d6d6
| 2324 Janice ||  ||  || November 7, 1978 || Palomar || E. F. Helin, S. J. Bus || — || align=right | 28 km || 
|-id=325 bgcolor=#d6d6d6
| 2325 Chernykh || 1979 SP ||  || September 25, 1979 || Kleť || A. Mrkos || THM || align=right | 23 km || 
|-id=326 bgcolor=#d6d6d6
| 2326 Tololo || 1965 QC ||  || August 29, 1965 || Brooklyn || Indiana University || — || align=right | 43 km || 
|-id=327 bgcolor=#fefefe
| 2327 Gershberg ||  ||  || October 13, 1969 || Nauchnij || B. A. Burnasheva || — || align=right | 5.4 km || 
|-id=328 bgcolor=#fefefe
| 2328 Robeson || 1972 HW ||  || April 19, 1972 || Nauchnij || T. M. Smirnova || — || align=right | 13 km || 
|-id=329 bgcolor=#FFC2E0
| 2329 Orthos || 1976 WA ||  || November 19, 1976 || La Silla || H.-E. Schuster || APO +1km || align=right | 4.4 km || 
|-id=330 bgcolor=#d6d6d6
| 2330 Ontake ||  ||  || February 18, 1977 || Kiso || H. Kosai, K. Furukawa || — || align=right | 33 km || 
|-id=331 bgcolor=#fefefe
| 2331 Parvulesco || 1936 EA ||  || March 12, 1936 || Uccle || E. Delporte || — || align=right | 5.7 km || 
|-id=332 bgcolor=#d6d6d6
| 2332 Kalm || 1940 GH ||  || April 4, 1940 || Turku || L. Oterma || — || align=right | 32 km || 
|-id=333 bgcolor=#E9E9E9
| 2333 Porthan || 1943 EP ||  || March 3, 1943 || Turku || Y. Väisälä || ADE || align=right | 23 km || 
|-id=334 bgcolor=#fefefe
| 2334 Cuffey || 1962 HD ||  || April 27, 1962 || Brooklyn || Indiana University || — || align=right | 6.4 km || 
|-id=335 bgcolor=#FA8072
| 2335 James || 1974 UB ||  || October 17, 1974 || Palomar || E. F. Helin || — || align=right | 6.4 km || 
|-id=336 bgcolor=#d6d6d6
| 2336 Xinjiang ||  ||  || November 26, 1975 || Nanking || Purple Mountain Obs. || THM || align=right | 22 km || 
|-id=337 bgcolor=#E9E9E9
| 2337 Boubín ||  ||  || October 22, 1976 || Zimmerwald || P. Wild || moon || align=right | 8.0 km || 
|-id=338 bgcolor=#d6d6d6
| 2338 Bokhan ||  ||  || August 22, 1977 || Nauchnij || N. S. Chernykh || KOR || align=right | 11 km || 
|-id=339 bgcolor=#E9E9E9
| 2339 Anacreon || 2509 P-L ||  || September 24, 1960 || Palomar || PLS || — || align=right | 7.3 km || 
|-id=340 bgcolor=#FFC2E0
| 2340 Hathor || 1976 UA ||  || October 22, 1976 || Palomar || C. T. Kowal || ATEPHA || align=right data-sort-value="0.3" | 300 m || 
|-id=341 bgcolor=#fefefe
| 2341 Aoluta ||  ||  || December 16, 1976 || Nauchnij || L. I. Chernykh || — || align=right | 6.5 km || 
|-id=342 bgcolor=#d6d6d6
| 2342 Lebedev || 1968 UQ ||  || October 22, 1968 || Nauchnij || T. M. Smirnova || THM || align=right | 22 km || 
|-id=343 bgcolor=#fefefe
| 2343 Siding Spring ||  ||  || June 25, 1979 || Siding Spring || E. F. Helin, S. J. Bus || NYSmoonfast || align=right | 5.2 km || 
|-id=344 bgcolor=#E9E9E9
| 2344 Xizang ||  ||  || September 27, 1979 || Nanking || Purple Mountain Obs. || XIZ || align=right | 16 km || 
|-id=345 bgcolor=#d6d6d6
| 2345 Fučik || 1974 OS ||  || July 25, 1974 || Nauchnij || T. M. Smirnova || EOS || align=right | 25 km || 
|-id=346 bgcolor=#fefefe
| 2346 Lilio || 1934 CB ||  || February 5, 1934 || Heidelberg || K. Reinmuth || V || align=right | 10 km || 
|-id=347 bgcolor=#d6d6d6
| 2347 Vinata || 1936 TK ||  || October 7, 1936 || Flagstaff || H. L. Giclas || — || align=right | 25 km || 
|-id=348 bgcolor=#fefefe
| 2348 Michkovitch || 1939 AA ||  || January 10, 1939 || Belgrade || M. B. Protić || ERI || align=right | 4.6 km || 
|-id=349 bgcolor=#E9E9E9
| 2349 Kurchenko || 1970 OG ||  || July 30, 1970 || Nauchnij || T. M. Smirnova || — || align=right | 19 km || 
|-id=350 bgcolor=#fefefe
| 2350 von Lüde || 1938 CG ||  || February 6, 1938 || Heidelberg || A. Bohrmann || FLO || align=right | 5.8 km || 
|-id=351 bgcolor=#E9E9E9
| 2351 O'Higgins || 1964 VD ||  || November 3, 1964 || Brooklyn || Indiana University || — || align=right | 5.8 km || 
|-id=352 bgcolor=#d6d6d6
| 2352 Kurchatov || 1969 RY ||  || September 10, 1969 || Nauchnij || L. I. Chernykh || URS || align=right | 30 km || 
|-id=353 bgcolor=#E9E9E9
| 2353 Alva || 1975 UD ||  || October 27, 1975 || Zimmerwald || P. Wild || — || align=right | 13 km || 
|-id=354 bgcolor=#E9E9E9
| 2354 Lavrov ||  ||  || August 9, 1978 || Nauchnij || L. I. Chernykh, N. S. Chernykh || HEN || align=right | 13 km || 
|-id=355 bgcolor=#d6d6d6
| 2355 Nei Monggol ||  ||  || October 30, 1978 || Nanking || Purple Mountain Obs. || — || align=right | 17 km || 
|-id=356 bgcolor=#d6d6d6
| 2356 Hirons || 1979 UJ ||  || October 17, 1979 || Anderson Mesa || E. Bowell || — || align=right | 43 km || 
|-id=357 bgcolor=#C2FFFF
| 2357 Phereclos || 1981 AC ||  || January 1, 1981 || Anderson Mesa || E. Bowell || L5 || align=right | 95 km || 
|-id=358 bgcolor=#d6d6d6
| 2358 Bahner || 1929 RE ||  || September 2, 1929 || Heidelberg || K. Reinmuth || EOS || align=right | 19 km || 
|-id=359 bgcolor=#fefefe
| 2359 Debehogne || 1931 TV ||  || October 5, 1931 || Heidelberg || K. Reinmuth || — || align=right | 6.1 km || 
|-id=360 bgcolor=#E9E9E9
| 2360 Volgo-Don ||  ||  || November 2, 1975 || Nauchnij || T. M. Smirnova || — || align=right | 9.7 km || 
|-id=361 bgcolor=#d6d6d6
| 2361 Gogol ||  ||  || April 1, 1976 || Nauchnij || N. S. Chernykh || THM || align=right | 22 km || 
|-id=362 bgcolor=#fefefe
| 2362 Mark Twain ||  ||  || September 24, 1976 || Nauchnij || N. S. Chernykh || — || align=right | 4.3 km || 
|-id=363 bgcolor=#C2FFFF
| 2363 Cebriones ||  ||  || October 4, 1977 || Nanking || Purple Mountain Obs. || L5 || align=right | 96 km || 
|-id=364 bgcolor=#d6d6d6
| 2364 Seillier || 1978 GD ||  || April 14, 1978 || La Silla || H. Debehogne || — || align=right | 20 km || 
|-id=365 bgcolor=#E9E9E9
| 2365 Interkosmos || 1980 YQ ||  || December 30, 1980 || Kleť || Z. Vávrová || — || align=right | 15 km || 
|-id=366 bgcolor=#fefefe
| 2366 Aaryn ||  ||  || January 10, 1981 || Anderson Mesa || N. G. Thomas || — || align=right | 4.8 km || 
|-id=367 bgcolor=#fefefe
| 2367 Praha ||  ||  || January 8, 1981 || Kleť || A. Mrkos || — || align=right | 5.0 km || 
|-id=368 bgcolor=#FFC2E0
| 2368 Beltrovata || 1977 RA ||  || September 4, 1977 || Zimmerwald || P. Wild || AMO +1km || align=right | 2.3 km || 
|-id=369 bgcolor=#E9E9E9
| 2369 Chekhov ||  ||  || April 4, 1976 || Nauchnij || N. S. Chernykh || HEN || align=right | 10 km || 
|-id=370 bgcolor=#E9E9E9
| 2370 van Altena || 1965 LA ||  || June 10, 1965 || El Leoncito || A. R. Klemola || — || align=right | 15 km || 
|-id=371 bgcolor=#fefefe
| 2371 Dimitrov ||  ||  || November 2, 1975 || Nauchnij || T. M. Smirnova || — || align=right | 7.5 km || 
|-id=372 bgcolor=#d6d6d6
| 2372 Proskurin ||  ||  || September 13, 1977 || Nauchnij || N. S. Chernykh || THM || align=right | 22 km || 
|-id=373 bgcolor=#E9E9E9
| 2373 Immo || 1929 PC ||  || August 4, 1929 || Heidelberg || M. F. Wolf || GEF || align=right | 8.7 km || 
|-id=374 bgcolor=#d6d6d6
| 2374 Vladvysotskij ||  ||  || August 22, 1974 || Nauchnij || L. V. Zhuravleva || MEL || align=right | 26 km || 
|-id=375 bgcolor=#d6d6d6
| 2375 Radek || 1975 AA ||  || January 8, 1975 || Hamburg-Bergedorf || L. Kohoutek || — || align=right | 33 km || 
|-id=376 bgcolor=#d6d6d6
| 2376 Martynov ||  ||  || August 22, 1977 || Nauchnij || N. S. Chernykh || — || align=right | 42 km || 
|-id=377 bgcolor=#d6d6d6
| 2377 Shcheglov ||  ||  || August 31, 1978 || Nauchnij || N. S. Chernykh || KOR || align=right | 10 km || 
|-id=378 bgcolor=#d6d6d6
| 2378 Pannekoek || 1935 CY ||  || February 13, 1935 || Johannesburg || H. van Gent || — || align=right | 40 km || 
|-id=379 bgcolor=#d6d6d6
| 2379 Heiskanen || 1941 ST ||  || September 21, 1941 || Turku || Y. Väisälä || — || align=right | 33 km || 
|-id=380 bgcolor=#fefefe
| 2380 Heilongjiang || 1965 SN ||  || September 18, 1965 || Nanking || Purple Mountain Obs. || — || align=right | 6.5 km || 
|-id=381 bgcolor=#E9E9E9
| 2381 Landi || 1976 AF ||  || January 3, 1976 || El Leoncito || Félix Aguilar Obs. || EUN || align=right | 13 km || 
|-id=382 bgcolor=#E9E9E9
| 2382 Nonie || 1977 GA ||  || April 13, 1977 || Bickley || Perth Obs. || PAL || align=right | 17 km || 
|-id=383 bgcolor=#fefefe
| 2383 Bradley || 1981 GN ||  || April 5, 1981 || Anderson Mesa || E. Bowell || — || align=right | 5.8 km || 
|-id=384 bgcolor=#E9E9E9
| 2384 Schulhof ||  ||  || March 2, 1943 || Nice || M. Laugier || SHF || align=right | 11 km || 
|-id=385 bgcolor=#fefefe
| 2385 Mustel || 1969 VW ||  || November 11, 1969 || Nauchnij || L. I. Chernykh || — || align=right | 6.0 km || 
|-id=386 bgcolor=#E9E9E9
| 2386 Nikonov ||  ||  || September 19, 1974 || Nauchnij || L. I. Chernykh || GEF || align=right | 12 km || 
|-id=387 bgcolor=#d6d6d6
| 2387 Xi'an || 1975 FX ||  || March 17, 1975 || Nanking || Purple Mountain Obs. || EOS || align=right | 21 km || 
|-id=388 bgcolor=#fefefe
| 2388 Gase ||  ||  || March 13, 1977 || Nauchnij || N. S. Chernykh || — || align=right | 6.5 km || 
|-id=389 bgcolor=#fefefe
| 2389 Dibaj ||  ||  || August 19, 1977 || Nauchnij || N. S. Chernykh || — || align=right | 5.8 km || 
|-id=390 bgcolor=#E9E9E9
| 2390 Nežárka ||  ||  || August 14, 1980 || Kleť || Z. Vávrová || — || align=right | 23 km || 
|-id=391 bgcolor=#fefefe
| 2391 Tomita || 1957 AA ||  || January 9, 1957 || Heidelberg || K. Reinmuth || — || align=right | 18 km || 
|-id=392 bgcolor=#fefefe
| 2392 Jonathan Murray ||  ||  || June 25, 1979 || Siding Spring || E. F. Helin, S. J. Bus || — || align=right | 10 km || 
|-id=393 bgcolor=#d6d6d6
| 2393 Suzuki || 1955 WB ||  || November 17, 1955 || Nice || M. Laugier || — || align=right | 48 km || 
|-id=394 bgcolor=#d6d6d6
| 2394 Nadeev ||  ||  || September 22, 1973 || Nauchnij || N. S. Chernykh || — || align=right | 23 km || 
|-id=395 bgcolor=#d6d6d6
| 2395 Aho || 1977 FA ||  || March 17, 1977 || Harvard Observatory || Harvard Obs. || — || align=right | 20 km || 
|-id=396 bgcolor=#E9E9E9
| 2396 Kochi || 1981 CB ||  || February 9, 1981 || Geisei || T. Seki || — || align=right | 10 km || 
|-id=397 bgcolor=#d6d6d6
| 2397 Lappajärvi || 1938 DV ||  || February 22, 1938 || Turku || Y. Väisälä || — || align=right | 16 km || 
|-id=398 bgcolor=#fefefe
| 2398 Jilin ||  ||  || October 24, 1965 || Nanking || Purple Mountain Obs. || — || align=right | 9.8 km || 
|-id=399 bgcolor=#fefefe
| 2399 Terradas || 1971 MA ||  || June 17, 1971 || El Leoncito || C. U. Cesco || FLO || align=right | 5.3 km || 
|-id=400 bgcolor=#d6d6d6
| 2400 Derevskaya || 1972 KJ ||  || May 17, 1972 || Nauchnij || T. M. Smirnova || EOS || align=right | 14 km || 
|}

2401–2500 

|-bgcolor=#E9E9E9
| 2401 Aehlita ||  ||  || November 2, 1975 || Nauchnij || T. M. Smirnova || AGN || align=right | 9.0 km || 
|-id=402 bgcolor=#fefefe
| 2402 Satpaev ||  ||  || July 31, 1979 || Nauchnij || N. S. Chernykh || FLO || align=right | 7.4 km || 
|-id=403 bgcolor=#E9E9E9
| 2403 Šumava || 1979 SQ ||  || September 25, 1979 || Kleť || A. Mrkos || — || align=right | 9.7 km || 
|-id=404 bgcolor=#d6d6d6
| 2404 Antarctica || 1980 TE ||  || October 1, 1980 || Kleť || A. Mrkos || THM || align=right | 23 km || 
|-id=405 bgcolor=#d6d6d6
| 2405 Welch || 1963 UF ||  || October 18, 1963 || Brooklyn || Indiana University || THM || align=right | 22 km || 
|-id=406 bgcolor=#fefefe
| 2406 Orelskaya || 1966 QG ||  || August 20, 1966 || Nauchnij || Crimean Astrophysical Obs. || — || align=right | 5.7 km || 
|-id=407 bgcolor=#d6d6d6
| 2407 Haug || 1973 DH ||  || February 27, 1973 || Hamburg-Bergedorf || L. Kohoutek || — || align=right | 22 km || 
|-id=408 bgcolor=#E9E9E9
| 2408 Astapovich ||  ||  || August 31, 1978 || Nauchnij || N. S. Chernykh || — || align=right | 31 km || 
|-id=409 bgcolor=#fefefe
| 2409 Chapman || 1979 UG ||  || October 17, 1979 || Anderson Mesa || E. Bowell || NYS || align=right | 8.7 km || 
|-id=410 bgcolor=#fefefe
| 2410 Morrison || 1981 AF ||  || January 3, 1981 || Anderson Mesa || E. Bowell || — || align=right | 6.4 km || 
|-id=411 bgcolor=#fefefe
| 2411 Zellner || 1981 JK ||  || May 3, 1981 || Anderson Mesa || E. Bowell || — || align=right | 8.1 km || 
|-id=412 bgcolor=#E9E9E9
| 2412 Wil || 3537 P-L ||  || October 17, 1960 || Palomar || PLS || — || align=right | 12 km || 
|-id=413 bgcolor=#d6d6d6
| 2413 van de Hulst || 6816 P-L ||  || September 24, 1960 || Palomar || PLS || EOS || align=right | 21 km || 
|-id=414 bgcolor=#d6d6d6
| 2414 Vibeke || 1931 UG ||  || October 18, 1931 || Heidelberg || K. Reinmuth || URS || align=right | 32 km || 
|-id=415 bgcolor=#E9E9E9
| 2415 Ganesa || 1978 UJ ||  || October 28, 1978 || Anderson Mesa || H. L. Giclas || — || align=right | 16 km || 
|-id=416 bgcolor=#d6d6d6
| 2416 Sharonov ||  ||  || July 31, 1979 || Nauchnij || N. S. Chernykh || EOS || align=right | 15 km || 
|-id=417 bgcolor=#d6d6d6
| 2417 McVittie || 1964 CD ||  || February 15, 1964 || Brooklyn || Indiana University || — || align=right | 18 km || 
|-id=418 bgcolor=#d6d6d6
| 2418 Voskovec-Werich || 1971 UV ||  || October 26, 1971 || Hamburg-Bergedorf || L. Kohoutek || THM || align=right | 12 km || 
|-id=419 bgcolor=#fefefe
| 2419 Moldavia || 1974 SJ ||  || September 19, 1974 || Nauchnij || L. I. Chernykh || V || align=right | 6.1 km || 
|-id=420 bgcolor=#E9E9E9
| 2420 Čiurlionis || 1975 TN ||  || October 3, 1975 || Nauchnij || N. S. Chernykh || — || align=right | 8.4 km || 
|-id=421 bgcolor=#d6d6d6
| 2421 Nininger || 1979 UD ||  || October 17, 1979 || Anderson Mesa || E. Bowell || — || align=right | 40 km || 
|-id=422 bgcolor=#fefefe
| 2422 Perovskaya ||  ||  || April 28, 1968 || Nauchnij || T. M. Smirnova || — || align=right | 5.6 km || 
|-id=423 bgcolor=#FA8072
| 2423 Ibarruri || 1972 NC ||  || July 14, 1972 || Nauchnij || L. V. Zhuravleva || slow || align=right | 4.9 km || 
|-id=424 bgcolor=#fefefe
| 2424 Tautenburg ||  ||  || October 27, 1973 || Tautenburg Observatory || F. Börngen, K. Kirsch || — || align=right | 6.9 km || 
|-id=425 bgcolor=#d6d6d6
| 2425 Shenzhen || 1975 FW ||  || March 17, 1975 || Nanking || Purple Mountain Obs. || EOS || align=right | 19 km || 
|-id=426 bgcolor=#d6d6d6
| 2426 Simonov || 1976 KV ||  || May 26, 1976 || Nauchnij || N. S. Chernykh || — || align=right | 26 km || 
|-id=427 bgcolor=#E9E9E9
| 2427 Kobzar ||  ||  || December 20, 1976 || Nauchnij || N. S. Chernykh || MRX || align=right | 8.0 km || 
|-id=428 bgcolor=#d6d6d6
| 2428 Kamenyar ||  ||  || September 11, 1977 || Nauchnij || N. S. Chernykh || VER || align=right | 24 km || 
|-id=429 bgcolor=#E9E9E9
| 2429 Schürer || 1977 TZ ||  || October 12, 1977 || Zimmerwald || P. Wild || MAR || align=right | 12 km || 
|-id=430 bgcolor=#fefefe
| 2430 Bruce Helin || 1977 VC ||  || November 8, 1977 || Palomar || E. F. Helin, E. M. Shoemaker || PHOslow || align=right | 12 km || 
|-id=431 bgcolor=#E9E9E9
| 2431 Skovoroda ||  ||  || August 8, 1978 || Nauchnij || N. S. Chernykh || — || align=right | 7.7 km || 
|-id=432 bgcolor=#fefefe
| 2432 Soomana || 1981 FA ||  || March 30, 1981 || Anderson Mesa || E. Bowell || — || align=right | 7.4 km || 
|-id=433 bgcolor=#E9E9E9
| 2433 Sootiyo || 1981 GJ ||  || April 5, 1981 || Anderson Mesa || E. Bowell || — || align=right | 12 km || 
|-id=434 bgcolor=#d6d6d6
| 2434 Bateson || 1981 KA ||  || May 27, 1981 || Lake Tekapo || A. C. Gilmore, P. M. Kilmartin || — || align=right | 17 km || 
|-id=435 bgcolor=#fefefe
| 2435 Horemheb || 4578 P-L ||  || September 24, 1960 || Palomar || PLS || — || align=right | 3.3 km || 
|-id=436 bgcolor=#d6d6d6
| 2436 Hatshepsut || 6066 P-L ||  || September 24, 1960 || Palomar || PLS || HYG || align=right | 19 km || 
|-id=437 bgcolor=#fefefe
| 2437 Amnestia || 1942 RZ ||  || September 14, 1942 || Turku || M. Väisälä || — || align=right | 6.7 km || 
|-id=438 bgcolor=#fefefe
| 2438 Oleshko ||  ||  || November 2, 1975 || Nauchnij || T. M. Smirnova || FLO || align=right | 7.2 km || 
|-id=439 bgcolor=#d6d6d6
| 2439 Ulugbek ||  ||  || August 21, 1977 || Nauchnij || N. S. Chernykh || THM || align=right | 21 km || 
|-id=440 bgcolor=#fefefe
| 2440 Educatio ||  ||  || November 7, 1978 || Palomar || E. F. Helin, S. J. Bus || FLOslow || align=right | 6.6 km || 
|-id=441 bgcolor=#fefefe
| 2441 Hibbs ||  ||  || June 25, 1979 || Siding Spring || E. F. Helin, S. J. Bus || — || align=right | 9.9 km || 
|-id=442 bgcolor=#fefefe
| 2442 Corbett || 1980 TO ||  || October 3, 1980 || Kleť || Z. Vávrová || — || align=right | 8.3 km || 
|-id=443 bgcolor=#d6d6d6
| 2443 Tomeileen || A906 BJ ||  || January 24, 1906 || Heidelberg || M. F. Wolf || EOS || align=right | 32 km || 
|-id=444 bgcolor=#E9E9E9
| 2444 Lederle || 1934 CD ||  || February 5, 1934 || Heidelberg || K. Reinmuth || — || align=right | 30 km || 
|-id=445 bgcolor=#fefefe
| 2445 Blazhko || 1935 TC ||  || October 3, 1935 || Crimea-Simeis || P. F. Shajn || FLO || align=right | 9.1 km || 
|-id=446 bgcolor=#fefefe
| 2446 Lunacharsky ||  ||  || October 14, 1971 || Nauchnij || L. I. Chernykh || NYS || align=right | 13 km || 
|-id=447 bgcolor=#E9E9E9
| 2447 Kronstadt ||  ||  || August 31, 1973 || Nauchnij || T. M. Smirnova || RAF || align=right | 7.9 km || 
|-id=448 bgcolor=#E9E9E9
| 2448 Sholokhov || 1975 BU ||  || January 18, 1975 || Nauchnij || L. I. Chernykh || WAT || align=right | 39 km || 
|-id=449 bgcolor=#FA8072
| 2449 Kenos || 1978 GC ||  || April 8, 1978 || Cerro Tololo || W. Liller || Hmoon || align=right | 4.6 km || 
|-id=450 bgcolor=#d6d6d6
| 2450 Ioannisiani || 1978 RP ||  || September 1, 1978 || Nauchnij || N. S. Chernykh || THM || align=right | 22 km || 
|-id=451 bgcolor=#E9E9E9
| 2451 Dollfus || 1980 RQ ||  || September 2, 1980 || Anderson Mesa || E. Bowell || — || align=right | 12 km || 
|-id=452 bgcolor=#d6d6d6
| 2452 Lyot || 1981 FE ||  || March 30, 1981 || Anderson Mesa || E. Bowell || — || align=right | 12 km || 
|-id=453 bgcolor=#d6d6d6
| 2453 Wabash || A921 SA ||  || September 30, 1921 || Heidelberg || K. Reinmuth || EOS || align=right | 19 km || 
|-id=454 bgcolor=#fefefe
| 2454 Olaus Magnus || 1941 SS ||  || September 21, 1941 || Turku || Y. Väisälä || FLO || align=right | 4.9 km || 
|-id=455 bgcolor=#E9E9E9
| 2455 Somville ||  ||  || October 5, 1950 || Uccle || S. Arend || — || align=right | 16 km || 
|-id=456 bgcolor=#C2FFFF
| 2456 Palamedes ||  ||  || January 30, 1966 || Nanking || Purple Mountain Obs. || L4 || align=right | 66 km || 
|-id=457 bgcolor=#E9E9E9
| 2457 Rublyov ||  ||  || October 3, 1975 || Nauchnij || L. I. Chernykh || — || align=right | 15 km || 
|-id=458 bgcolor=#d6d6d6
| 2458 Veniakaverin ||  ||  || September 11, 1977 || Nauchnij || N. S. Chernykh || THM || align=right | 23 km || 
|-id=459 bgcolor=#d6d6d6
| 2459 Spellmann ||  ||  || June 11, 1980 || Palomar || C. S. Shoemaker || EOS || align=right | 18 km || 
|-id=460 bgcolor=#fefefe
| 2460 Mitlincoln ||  ||  || October 1, 1980 || Socorro || L. G. Taff, D. Beatty || — || align=right | 9.3 km || 
|-id=461 bgcolor=#d6d6d6
| 2461 Clavel ||  ||  || March 5, 1981 || La Silla || H. Debehogne, G. DeSanctis || THM || align=right | 26 km || 
|-id=462 bgcolor=#fefefe
| 2462 Nehalennia || 6578 P-L ||  || September 24, 1960 || Palomar || PLS || NYS || align=right | 4.7 km || 
|-id=463 bgcolor=#E9E9E9
| 2463 Sterpin || 1934 FF ||  || March 10, 1934 || Williams Bay || G. Van Biesbroeck || EUN || align=right | 11 km || 
|-id=464 bgcolor=#d6d6d6
| 2464 Nordenskiöld || 1939 BF ||  || January 19, 1939 || Turku || Y. Väisälä || — || align=right | 22 km || 
|-id=465 bgcolor=#E9E9E9
| 2465 Wilson || 1949 PK ||  || August 2, 1949 || Heidelberg || K. Reinmuth || — || align=right | 22 km || 
|-id=466 bgcolor=#E9E9E9
| 2466 Golson || 1959 RJ ||  || September 7, 1959 || Brooklyn || Indiana University || — || align=right | 24 km || 
|-id=467 bgcolor=#fefefe
| 2467 Kollontai || 1966 PJ ||  || August 14, 1966 || Nauchnij || L. I. Chernykh || — || align=right | 8.1 km || 
|-id=468 bgcolor=#fefefe
| 2468 Repin ||  ||  || October 8, 1969 || Nauchnij || L. I. Chernykh || V || align=right | 6.2 km || 
|-id=469 bgcolor=#d6d6d6
| 2469 Tadjikistan || 1970 HA ||  || April 27, 1970 || Nauchnij || T. M. Smirnova || — || align=right | 13 km || 
|-id=470 bgcolor=#d6d6d6
| 2470 Agematsu ||  ||  || October 22, 1976 || Kiso || H. Kosai, K. Furukawa || KOR || align=right | 11 km || 
|-id=471 bgcolor=#d6d6d6
| 2471 Ultrajectum || 6545 P-L ||  || September 24, 1960 || Palomar || PLS || EOS || align=right | 16 km || 
|-id=472 bgcolor=#fefefe
| 2472 Bradman || 1973 DG ||  || February 27, 1973 || Hamburg-Bergedorf || L. Kohoutek || FLO || align=right | 3.5 km || 
|-id=473 bgcolor=#fefefe
| 2473 Heyerdahl ||  ||  || September 12, 1977 || Nauchnij || N. S. Chernykh || FLO || align=right | 4.9 km || 
|-id=474 bgcolor=#E9E9E9
| 2474 Ruby || 1979 PB ||  || August 14, 1979 || Kleť || Z. Vávrová || — || align=right | 24 km || 
|-id=475 bgcolor=#d6d6d6
| 2475 Semenov ||  ||  || October 8, 1972 || Nauchnij || L. V. Zhuravleva || — || align=right | 14 km || 
|-id=476 bgcolor=#d6d6d6
| 2476 Andersen ||  ||  || May 2, 1976 || Nauchnij || N. S. Chernykh || EOS || align=right | 21 km || 
|-id=477 bgcolor=#E9E9E9
| 2477 Biryukov ||  ||  || August 14, 1977 || Nauchnij || N. S. Chernykh || — || align=right | 18 km || 
|-id=478 bgcolor=#fefefe
| 2478 Tokai || 1981 JC ||  || May 4, 1981 || Tōkai || T. Furuta || FLOmoon || align=right | 9.2 km || 
|-id=479 bgcolor=#fefefe
| 2479 Sodankylä || 1942 CB ||  || February 6, 1942 || Turku || Y. Väisälä || — || align=right | 6.4 km || 
|-id=480 bgcolor=#fefefe
| 2480 Papanov ||  ||  || December 16, 1976 || Nauchnij || L. I. Chernykh || — || align=right | 6.0 km || 
|-id=481 bgcolor=#E9E9E9
| 2481 Bürgi || 1977 UQ ||  || October 18, 1977 || Zimmerwald || P. Wild || — || align=right | 4.7 km || 
|-id=482 bgcolor=#d6d6d6
| 2482 Perkin || 1980 CO ||  || February 13, 1980 || Harvard Observatory || Harvard Obs. || KOR || align=right | 11 km || 
|-id=483 bgcolor=#d6d6d6
| 2483 Guinevere || 1928 QB ||  || August 17, 1928 || Heidelberg || M. F. Wolf || 3:2 || align=right | 36 km || 
|-id=484 bgcolor=#fefefe
| 2484 Parenago || 1928 TK ||  || October 7, 1928 || Crimea-Simeis || G. N. Neujmin || — || align=right | 6.3 km || 
|-id=485 bgcolor=#d6d6d6
| 2485 Scheffler || 1932 BH ||  || January 29, 1932 || Heidelberg || K. Reinmuth || — || align=right | 14 km || 
|-id=486 bgcolor=#fefefe
| 2486 Metsähovi || 1939 FY ||  || March 22, 1939 || Turku || Y. Väisälä || moon || align=right | 7.9 km || 
|-id=487 bgcolor=#fefefe
| 2487 Juhani || 1940 RL ||  || September 8, 1940 || Turku || H. Alikoski || NYSslow || align=right | 9.5 km || 
|-id=488 bgcolor=#fefefe
| 2488 Bryan || 1952 UT ||  || October 23, 1952 || Brooklyn || Indiana University || — || align=right | 4.4 km || 
|-id=489 bgcolor=#d6d6d6
| 2489 Suvorov || 1975 NY ||  || July 11, 1975 || Nauchnij || L. I. Chernykh || THM || align=right | 21 km || 
|-id=490 bgcolor=#E9E9E9
| 2490 Bussolini || 1976 AG ||  || January 3, 1976 || El Leoncito || Félix Aguilar Obs. || EUN || align=right | 12 km || 
|-id=491 bgcolor=#fefefe
| 2491 Tvashtri || 1977 CB ||  || February 15, 1977 || Palomar || W. Sebok || Hmoon || align=right | 3.3 km || 
|-id=492 bgcolor=#d6d6d6
| 2492 Kutuzov || 1977 NT ||  || July 14, 1977 || Nauchnij || N. S. Chernykh || THM || align=right | 28 km || 
|-id=493 bgcolor=#E9E9E9
| 2493 Elmer || 1978 XC ||  || December 1, 1978 || Harvard Observatory || Harvard Obs. || GEF || align=right | 7.4 km || 
|-id=494 bgcolor=#d6d6d6
| 2494 Inge || 1981 LF ||  || June 4, 1981 || Anderson Mesa || E. Bowell || — || align=right | 47 km || 
|-id=495 bgcolor=#fefefe
| 2495 Noviomagum || 7071 P-L ||  || October 17, 1960 || Palomar || PLS || H || align=right | 1.7 km || 
|-id=496 bgcolor=#fefefe
| 2496 Fernandus ||  ||  || October 8, 1953 || Brooklyn || Indiana University || — || align=right | 5.7 km || 
|-id=497 bgcolor=#E9E9E9
| 2497 Kulikovskij ||  ||  || August 14, 1977 || Nauchnij || N. S. Chernykh || — || align=right | 6.7 km || 
|-id=498 bgcolor=#d6d6d6
| 2498 Tsesevich ||  ||  || August 23, 1977 || Nauchnij || N. S. Chernykh || KOR || align=right | 11 km || 
|-id=499 bgcolor=#d6d6d6
| 2499 Brunk ||  ||  || November 7, 1978 || Palomar || E. F. Helin, S. J. Bus || THM || align=right | 16 km || 
|-id=500 bgcolor=#fefefe
| 2500 Alascattalo || 1926 GC ||  || April 2, 1926 || Heidelberg || K. Reinmuth || FLOmoon || align=right | 7.5 km || 
|}

2501–2600 

|-bgcolor=#fefefe
| 2501 Lohja || 1942 GD ||  || April 14, 1942 || Turku || L. Oterma || — || align=right | 10 km || 
|-id=502 bgcolor=#d6d6d6
| 2502 Nummela || 1943 EO ||  || March 3, 1943 || Turku || Y. Väisälä || — || align=right | 19 km || 
|-id=503 bgcolor=#fefefe
| 2503 Liaoning ||  ||  || October 16, 1965 || Nanking || Purple Mountain Obs. || — || align=right | 6.7 km || 
|-id=504 bgcolor=#E9E9E9
| 2504 Gaviola || 1967 JO ||  || May 6, 1967 || El Leoncito || C. U. Cesco, A. R. Klemola || — || align=right | 11 km || 
|-id=505 bgcolor=#d6d6d6
| 2505 Hebei || 1975 UJ ||  || October 31, 1975 || Nanking || Purple Mountain Obs. || THM || align=right | 22 km || 
|-id=506 bgcolor=#d6d6d6
| 2506 Pirogov ||  ||  || August 26, 1976 || Nauchnij || N. S. Chernykh || KOR || align=right | 11 km || 
|-id=507 bgcolor=#E9E9E9
| 2507 Bobone ||  ||  || November 18, 1976 || El Leoncito || Félix Aguilar Obs. || — || align=right | 16 km || 
|-id=508 bgcolor=#fefefe
| 2508 Alupka ||  ||  || March 13, 1977 || Nauchnij || N. S. Chernykh || V || align=right | 4.9 km || 
|-id=509 bgcolor=#fefefe
| 2509 Chukotka || 1977 NG ||  || July 14, 1977 || Nauchnij || N. S. Chernykh || NYS || align=right | 17 km || 
|-id=510 bgcolor=#fefefe
| 2510 Shandong || 1979 TH ||  || October 10, 1979 || Nanking || Purple Mountain Obs. || FLO || align=right | 9.1 km || 
|-id=511 bgcolor=#fefefe
| 2511 Patterson || 1980 LM ||  || June 11, 1980 || Palomar || C. S. Shoemaker || V || align=right | 7.8 km || 
|-id=512 bgcolor=#fefefe
| 2512 Tavastia || 1940 GG ||  || April 3, 1940 || Turku || Y. Väisälä || FLO || align=right | 7.5 km || 
|-id=513 bgcolor=#fefefe
| 2513 Baetslé || 1950 SH ||  || September 19, 1950 || Uccle || S. Arend || — || align=right | 5.1 km || 
|-id=514 bgcolor=#E9E9E9
| 2514 Taiyuan ||  ||  || October 8, 1964 || Nanking || Purple Mountain Obs. || HEN || align=right | 8.8 km || 
|-id=515 bgcolor=#d6d6d6
| 2515 Gansu ||  ||  || October 9, 1964 || Nanking || Purple Mountain Obs. || — || align=right | 16 km || 
|-id=516 bgcolor=#fefefe
| 2516 Roman || 1964 VY ||  || November 6, 1964 || Brooklyn || Indiana University || moon || align=right | 4.4 km || 
|-id=517 bgcolor=#d6d6d6
| 2517 Orma || 1968 SB ||  || September 28, 1968 || Zimmerwald || P. Wild || THM || align=right | 20 km || 
|-id=518 bgcolor=#fefefe
| 2518 Rutllant || 1974 FG ||  || March 22, 1974 || Cerro El Roble || C. Torres || — || align=right | 3.2 km || 
|-id=519 bgcolor=#d6d6d6
| 2519 Annagerman ||  ||  || November 2, 1975 || Nauchnij || T. M. Smirnova || THM || align=right | 21 km || 
|-id=520 bgcolor=#d6d6d6
| 2520 Novorossijsk ||  ||  || August 26, 1976 || Nauchnij || N. S. Chernykh || — || align=right | 30 km || 
|-id=521 bgcolor=#E9E9E9
| 2521 Heidi || 1979 DK ||  || February 28, 1979 || Zimmerwald || P. Wild || GEF || align=right | 13 km || 
|-id=522 bgcolor=#d6d6d6
| 2522 Triglav || 1980 PP ||  || August 6, 1980 || Kleť || Z. Vávrová || EOS || align=right | 17 km || 
|-id=523 bgcolor=#d6d6d6
| 2523 Ryba || 1980 PV ||  || August 6, 1980 || Kleť || Z. Vávrová || EOS || align=right | 17 km || 
|-id=524 bgcolor=#d6d6d6
| 2524 Budovicium ||  ||  || August 28, 1981 || Kleť || Z. Vávrová || THM || align=right | 33 km || 
|-id=525 bgcolor=#d6d6d6
| 2525 O'Steen || 1981 VG ||  || November 2, 1981 || Anderson Mesa || B. A. Skiff || THM || align=right | 30 km || 
|-id=526 bgcolor=#d6d6d6
| 2526 Alisary || 1979 KX ||  || May 19, 1979 || La Silla || R. M. West || — || align=right | 15 km || 
|-id=527 bgcolor=#fefefe
| 2527 Gregory || 1981 RE ||  || September 3, 1981 || Anderson Mesa || N. G. Thomas || NYS || align=right | 13 km || 
|-id=528 bgcolor=#d6d6d6
| 2528 Mohler ||  ||  || October 8, 1953 || Brooklyn || Indiana University || THM || align=right | 19 km || 
|-id=529 bgcolor=#E9E9E9
| 2529 Rockwell Kent ||  ||  || August 21, 1977 || Nauchnij || N. S. Chernykh || — || align=right | 7.4 km || 
|-id=530 bgcolor=#d6d6d6
| 2530 Shipka ||  ||  || July 9, 1978 || Nauchnij || L. I. Chernykh || EOS || align=right | 12 km || 
|-id=531 bgcolor=#d6d6d6
| 2531 Cambridge || 1980 LD ||  || June 11, 1980 || Anderson Mesa || E. Bowell || EOS || align=right | 22 km || 
|-id=532 bgcolor=#fefefe
| 2532 Sutton ||  ||  || October 9, 1980 || Palomar || C. S. Shoemaker || FLO || align=right | 7.0 km || 
|-id=533 bgcolor=#d6d6d6
| 2533 Fechtig || A905 VA ||  || November 3, 1905 || Heidelberg || M. F. Wolf || THM || align=right | 21 km || 
|-id=534 bgcolor=#d6d6d6
| 2534 Houzeau || 1931 VD ||  || November 2, 1931 || Uccle || E. Delporte || THM || align=right | 31 km || 
|-id=535 bgcolor=#fefefe
| 2535 Hämeenlinna || 1939 DH ||  || February 17, 1939 || Turku || Y. Väisälä || moon || align=right | 7.1 km || 
|-id=536 bgcolor=#fefefe
| 2536 Kozyrev || 1939 PJ ||  || August 15, 1939 || Crimea-Simeis || G. N. Neujmin || — || align=right | 8.0 km || 
|-id=537 bgcolor=#E9E9E9
| 2537 Gilmore || 1951 RL ||  || September 4, 1951 || Heidelberg || K. Reinmuth || EUN || align=right | 7.2 km || 
|-id=538 bgcolor=#fefefe
| 2538 Vanderlinden || 1954 UD ||  || October 30, 1954 || Uccle || S. Arend || — || align=right | 5.5 km || 
|-id=539 bgcolor=#fefefe
| 2539 Ningxia ||  ||  || October 8, 1964 || Nanking || Purple Mountain Obs. || — || align=right | 3.6 km || 
|-id=540 bgcolor=#fefefe
| 2540 Blok ||  ||  || October 13, 1971 || Nauchnij || L. I. Chernykh || — || align=right | 5.7 km || 
|-id=541 bgcolor=#d6d6d6
| 2541 Edebono || 1973 DE ||  || February 27, 1973 || Hamburg-Bergedorf || L. Kohoutek || KOR || align=right | 10 km || 
|-id=542 bgcolor=#d6d6d6
| 2542 Calpurnia || 1980 CF ||  || February 11, 1980 || Anderson Mesa || E. Bowell || — || align=right | 21 km || 
|-id=543 bgcolor=#d6d6d6
| 2543 Machado || 1980 LJ ||  || June 1, 1980 || La Silla || H. Debehogne || — || align=right | 14 km || 
|-id=544 bgcolor=#fefefe
| 2544 Gubarev || 1980 PS ||  || August 6, 1980 || Kleť || Z. Vávrová || PHO || align=right | 9.3 km || 
|-id=545 bgcolor=#fefefe
| 2545 Verbiest || 1933 BB ||  || January 26, 1933 || Uccle || E. Delporte || FLO || align=right | 6.9 km || 
|-id=546 bgcolor=#E9E9E9
| 2546 Libitina || 1950 FC ||  || March 23, 1950 || Johannesburg || E. L. Johnson || slow || align=right | 14 km || 
|-id=547 bgcolor=#fefefe
| 2547 Hubei ||  ||  || October 9, 1964 || Nanking || Purple Mountain Obs. || V || align=right | 4.0 km || 
|-id=548 bgcolor=#E9E9E9
| 2548 Leloir || 1975 DA ||  || February 16, 1975 || El Leoncito || Félix Aguilar Obs. || — || align=right | 10 km || 
|-id=549 bgcolor=#d6d6d6
| 2549 Baker || 1976 UB ||  || October 23, 1976 || Harvard Observatory || Harvard Obs. || THM || align=right | 17 km || 
|-id=550 bgcolor=#d6d6d6
| 2550 Houssay ||  ||  || October 21, 1976 || El Leoncito || Félix Aguilar Obs. || — || align=right | 22 km || 
|-id=551 bgcolor=#d6d6d6
| 2551 Decabrina ||  ||  || December 16, 1976 || Nauchnij || L. I. Chernykh || THM || align=right | 16 km || 
|-id=552 bgcolor=#fefefe
| 2552 Remek || 1978 SP ||  || September 24, 1978 || Kleť || A. Mrkos || — || align=right | 3.9 km || 
|-id=553 bgcolor=#d6d6d6
| 2553 Viljev ||  ||  || March 29, 1979 || Nauchnij || N. S. Chernykh || — || align=right | 14 km || 
|-id=554 bgcolor=#fefefe
| 2554 Skiff || 1980 OB ||  || July 17, 1980 || Anderson Mesa || E. Bowell || FLOslow || align=right | 6.0 km || 
|-id=555 bgcolor=#d6d6d6
| 2555 Thomas || 1980 OC ||  || July 17, 1980 || Anderson Mesa || E. Bowell || KOR || align=right | 10 km || 
|-id=556 bgcolor=#fefefe
| 2556 Louise || 1981 CS ||  || February 8, 1981 || Anderson Mesa || N. G. Thomas || — || align=right | 6.2 km || 
|-id=557 bgcolor=#fefefe
| 2557 Putnam ||  ||  || September 26, 1981 || Anderson Mesa || B. A. Skiff, N. G. Thomas || — || align=right | 7.5 km || 
|-id=558 bgcolor=#fefefe
| 2558 Viv ||  ||  || September 26, 1981 || Anderson Mesa || N. G. Thomas || — || align=right | 5.0 km || 
|-id=559 bgcolor=#E9E9E9
| 2559 Svoboda || 1981 UH ||  || October 23, 1981 || Kleť || A. Mrkos || — || align=right | 21 km || 
|-id=560 bgcolor=#E9E9E9
| 2560 Siegma || 1932 CW ||  || February 14, 1932 || Heidelberg || K. Reinmuth || PAD || align=right | 18 km || 
|-id=561 bgcolor=#fefefe
| 2561 Margolin ||  ||  || October 8, 1969 || Nauchnij || L. I. Chernykh || NYS || align=right | 12 km || 
|-id=562 bgcolor=#d6d6d6
| 2562 Chaliapin ||  ||  || March 27, 1973 || Nauchnij || L. V. Zhuravleva || EOS || align=right | 16 km || 
|-id=563 bgcolor=#d6d6d6
| 2563 Boyarchuk || 1977 FZ ||  || March 22, 1977 || Nauchnij || N. S. Chernykh || — || align=right | 24 km || 
|-id=564 bgcolor=#fefefe
| 2564 Kayala || 1977 QX ||  || August 19, 1977 || Nauchnij || N. S. Chernykh || — || align=right | 6.2 km || 
|-id=565 bgcolor=#fefefe
| 2565 Grögler ||  ||  || October 12, 1977 || Zimmerwald || P. Wild || NYSfast || align=right | 3.5 km || 
|-id=566 bgcolor=#fefefe
| 2566 Kirghizia ||  ||  || March 29, 1979 || Nauchnij || N. S. Chernykh || — || align=right | 7.8 km || 
|-id=567 bgcolor=#E9E9E9
| 2567 Elba || 1979 KA ||  || May 19, 1979 || La Silla || O. Pizarro, G. Pizarro || — || align=right | 16 km || 
|-id=568 bgcolor=#fefefe
| 2568 Maksutov || 1980 GH ||  || April 13, 1980 || Kleť || Z. Vávrová || — || align=right | 4.6 km || 
|-id=569 bgcolor=#E9E9E9
| 2569 Madeline || 1980 MA ||  || June 18, 1980 || Anderson Mesa || E. Bowell || — || align=right | 26 km || 
|-id=570 bgcolor=#E9E9E9
| 2570 Porphyro || 1980 PG ||  || August 6, 1980 || Anderson Mesa || E. Bowell || — || align=right | 25 km || 
|-id=571 bgcolor=#fefefe
| 2571 Geisei || 1981 UC ||  || October 23, 1981 || Geisei || T. Seki || — || align=right | 6.6 km || 
|-id=572 bgcolor=#fefefe
| 2572 Annschnell || 1950 DL ||  || February 17, 1950 || Heidelberg || K. Reinmuth || — || align=right | 3.4 km || 
|-id=573 bgcolor=#d6d6d6
| 2573 Hannu Olavi || 1953 EN ||  || March 10, 1953 || Turku || H. Alikoski || — || align=right | 20 km || 
|-id=574 bgcolor=#d6d6d6
| 2574 Ladoga || 1968 UP ||  || October 22, 1968 || Nauchnij || T. M. Smirnova || KOR || align=right | 13 km || 
|-id=575 bgcolor=#fefefe
| 2575 Bulgaria || 1970 PL ||  || August 4, 1970 || Nauchnij || T. M. Smirnova || FLO || align=right | 6.4 km || 
|-id=576 bgcolor=#d6d6d6
| 2576 Yesenin || 1974 QL ||  || August 17, 1974 || Nauchnij || L. V. Zhuravleva || slow || align=right | 28 km || 
|-id=577 bgcolor=#FA8072
| 2577 Litva ||  ||  || March 12, 1975 || Nauchnij || N. S. Chernykh || Hmoon || align=right | 7.4 km || 
|-id=578 bgcolor=#d6d6d6
| 2578 Saint-Exupéry ||  ||  || November 2, 1975 || Nauchnij || T. M. Smirnova || EOS || align=right | 17 km || 
|-id=579 bgcolor=#fefefe
| 2579 Spartacus ||  ||  || August 14, 1977 || Nauchnij || N. S. Chernykh || — || align=right | 4.6 km || 
|-id=580 bgcolor=#fefefe
| 2580 Smilevskia ||  ||  || August 18, 1977 || Nauchnij || N. S. Chernykh || — || align=right | 7.2 km || 
|-id=581 bgcolor=#fefefe
| 2581 Radegast || 1980 VX ||  || November 11, 1980 || Kleť || Z. Vávrová || — || align=right | 6.7 km || 
|-id=582 bgcolor=#d6d6d6
| 2582 Harimaya-Bashi || 1981 SA ||  || September 26, 1981 || Geisei || T. Seki || — || align=right | 29 km || 
|-id=583 bgcolor=#fefefe
| 2583 Fatyanov ||  ||  || December 3, 1975 || Nauchnij || T. M. Smirnova || FLO || align=right | 5.7 km || 
|-id=584 bgcolor=#fefefe
| 2584 Turkmenia ||  ||  || March 23, 1979 || Nauchnij || N. S. Chernykh || — || align=right | 6.2 km || 
|-id=585 bgcolor=#fefefe
| 2585 Irpedina ||  ||  || July 21, 1979 || Nauchnij || N. S. Chernykh || — || align=right | 6.0 km || 
|-id=586 bgcolor=#fefefe
| 2586 Matson || 1980 LO ||  || June 11, 1980 || Palomar || C. S. Shoemaker || — || align=right | 6.5 km || 
|-id=587 bgcolor=#d6d6d6
| 2587 Gardner || 1980 OH ||  || July 17, 1980 || Anderson Mesa || E. Bowell || THM || align=right | 21 km || 
|-id=588 bgcolor=#fefefe
| 2588 Flavia || 1981 VQ ||  || November 2, 1981 || Anderson Mesa || B. A. Skiff || — || align=right | 6.2 km || 
|-id=589 bgcolor=#d6d6d6
| 2589 Daniel ||  ||  || August 22, 1979 || La Silla || C.-I. Lagerkvist || KOR || align=right | 9.4 km || 
|-id=590 bgcolor=#fefefe
| 2590 Mourão || 1980 KJ ||  || May 22, 1980 || La Silla || H. Debehogne || V || align=right | 7.9 km || 
|-id=591 bgcolor=#d6d6d6
| 2591 Dworetsky || 1949 PS ||  || August 2, 1949 || Heidelberg || K. Reinmuth || KOR || align=right | 13 km || 
|-id=592 bgcolor=#d6d6d6
| 2592 Hunan || 1966 BW ||  || January 30, 1966 || Nanking || Purple Mountain Obs. || THM || align=right | 19 km || 
|-id=593 bgcolor=#fefefe
| 2593 Buryatia ||  ||  || April 2, 1976 || Nauchnij || N. S. Chernykh || — || align=right | 3.9 km || 
|-id=594 bgcolor=#C2FFFF
| 2594 Acamas || 1978 TB ||  || October 4, 1978 || Palomar || C. T. Kowal || L5 || align=right | 26 km || 
|-id=595 bgcolor=#E9E9E9
| 2595 Gudiachvili || 1979 KL ||  || May 19, 1979 || La Silla || R. M. West || — || align=right | 14 km || 
|-id=596 bgcolor=#d6d6d6
| 2596 Vainu Bappu || 1979 KN ||  || May 19, 1979 || La Silla || R. M. West || — || align=right | 11 km || 
|-id=597 bgcolor=#d6d6d6
| 2597 Arthur || 1980 PN ||  || August 8, 1980 || Anderson Mesa || E. Bowell || — || align=right | 10 km || 
|-id=598 bgcolor=#E9E9E9
| 2598 Merlin || 1980 RY ||  || September 7, 1980 || Anderson Mesa || E. Bowell || DOR || align=right | 16 km || 
|-id=599 bgcolor=#E9E9E9
| 2599 Veselí || 1980 SO ||  || September 29, 1980 || Kleť || Z. Vávrová || — || align=right | 13 km || 
|-id=600 bgcolor=#d6d6d6
| 2600 Lumme || 1980 VP ||  || November 9, 1980 || Anderson Mesa || E. Bowell || EOS || align=right | 15 km || 
|}

2601–2700 

|-bgcolor=#d6d6d6
| 2601 Bologna || 1980 XA ||  || December 8, 1980 || Bologna || San Vittore Obs. || EOS || align=right | 12 km || 
|-id=602 bgcolor=#fefefe
| 2602 Moore || 1982 BR ||  || January 24, 1982 || Anderson Mesa || E. Bowell || moon || align=right | 8.1 km || 
|-id=603 bgcolor=#E9E9E9
| 2603 Taylor ||  ||  || January 30, 1982 || Anderson Mesa || E. Bowell || — || align=right | 18 km || 
|-id=604 bgcolor=#fefefe
| 2604 Marshak ||  ||  || June 13, 1972 || Nauchnij || T. M. Smirnova || — || align=right | 15 km || 
|-id=605 bgcolor=#d6d6d6
| 2605 Sahade || 1974 QA ||  || August 16, 1974 || El Leoncito || Félix Aguilar Obs. || EOS || align=right | 12 km || 
|-id=606 bgcolor=#E9E9E9
| 2606 Odessa ||  ||  || April 1, 1976 || Nauchnij || N. S. Chernykh || — || align=right | 16 km || 
|-id=607 bgcolor=#fefefe
| 2607 Yakutia || 1977 NR ||  || July 14, 1977 || Nauchnij || N. S. Chernykh || NYS || align=right | 4.7 km || 
|-id=608 bgcolor=#FFC2E0
| 2608 Seneca || 1978 DA ||  || February 17, 1978 || La Silla || H.-E. Schuster || AMO +1km || align=right data-sort-value="0.9" | 900 m || 
|-id=609 bgcolor=#fefefe
| 2609 Kiril-Metodi ||  ||  || August 9, 1978 || Nauchnij || N. S. Chernykh, L. I. Chernykh || FLO || align=right | 5.6 km || 
|-id=610 bgcolor=#fefefe
| 2610 Tuva ||  ||  || September 5, 1978 || Nauchnij || N. S. Chernykh || — || align=right | 5.6 km || 
|-id=611 bgcolor=#d6d6d6
| 2611 Boyce ||  ||  || November 7, 1978 || Palomar || E. F. Helin, S. J. Bus || — || align=right | 18 km || 
|-id=612 bgcolor=#d6d6d6
| 2612 Kathryn || 1979 DE ||  || February 28, 1979 || Anderson Mesa || N. G. Thomas || — || align=right | 25 km || 
|-id=613 bgcolor=#d6d6d6
| 2613 Plzeň || 1979 QE ||  || August 30, 1979 || Kleť || L. Brožek || — || align=right | 28 km || 
|-id=614 bgcolor=#fefefe
| 2614 Torrence || 1980 LP ||  || June 11, 1980 || Palomar || C. S. Shoemaker || — || align=right | 7.1 km || 
|-id=615 bgcolor=#d6d6d6
| 2615 Saito || 1951 RJ ||  || September 4, 1951 || Heidelberg || K. Reinmuth || HYG || align=right | 16 km || 
|-id=616 bgcolor=#fefefe
| 2616 Lesya || 1970 QV ||  || August 28, 1970 || Nauchnij || T. M. Smirnova || — || align=right | 8.5 km || 
|-id=617 bgcolor=#d6d6d6
| 2617 Jiangxi ||  ||  || November 26, 1975 || Nanking || Purple Mountain Obs. || — || align=right | 49 km || 
|-id=618 bgcolor=#d6d6d6
| 2618 Coonabarabran ||  ||  || June 25, 1979 || Siding Spring || E. F. Helin, S. J. Bus || EOS || align=right | 12 km || 
|-id=619 bgcolor=#d6d6d6
| 2619 Skalnaté Pleso ||  ||  || June 25, 1979 || Siding Spring || E. F. Helin, S. J. Bus || — || align=right | 15 km || 
|-id=620 bgcolor=#d6d6d6
| 2620 Santana || 1980 TN ||  || October 3, 1980 || Kleť || Z. Vávrová || KOR || align=right | 9.3 km || 
|-id=621 bgcolor=#d6d6d6
| 2621 Goto || 1981 CA ||  || February 9, 1981 || Geisei || T. Seki || — || align=right | 45 km || 
|-id=622 bgcolor=#d6d6d6
| 2622 Bolzano || 1981 CM ||  || February 9, 1981 || Kleť || L. Brožek || EOS || align=right | 14 km || 
|-id=623 bgcolor=#fefefe
| 2623 Zech || A919 SA ||  || September 22, 1919 || Heidelberg || K. Reinmuth || moon || align=right | 6.4 km || 
|-id=624 bgcolor=#d6d6d6
| 2624 Samitchell || 1962 RE ||  || September 7, 1962 || Brooklyn || Indiana University || 3:2 || align=right | 37 km || 
|-id=625 bgcolor=#fefefe
| 2625 Jack London ||  ||  || May 2, 1976 || Nauchnij || N. S. Chernykh || — || align=right | 6.0 km || 
|-id=626 bgcolor=#d6d6d6
| 2626 Belnika ||  ||  || August 8, 1978 || Nauchnij || N. S. Chernykh || KOR || align=right | 12 km || 
|-id=627 bgcolor=#d6d6d6
| 2627 Churyumov ||  ||  || August 8, 1978 || Nauchnij || N. S. Chernykh || THM || align=right | 20 km || 
|-id=628 bgcolor=#d6d6d6
| 2628 Kopal ||  ||  || June 25, 1979 || Siding Spring || E. F. Helin, S. J. Bus || — || align=right | 16 km || 
|-id=629 bgcolor=#FA8072
| 2629 Rudra ||  ||  || September 13, 1980 || Palomar || C. T. Kowal || slow || align=right | 4.7 km || 
|-id=630 bgcolor=#d6d6d6
| 2630 Hermod ||  ||  || October 14, 1980 || Haute-Provence || Haute-Provence Obs. || — || align=right | 25 km || 
|-id=631 bgcolor=#E9E9E9
| 2631 Zhejiang ||  ||  || October 7, 1980 || Nanking || Purple Mountain Obs. || GEF || align=right | 11 km || 
|-id=632 bgcolor=#d6d6d6
| 2632 Guizhou ||  ||  || November 6, 1980 || Nanking || Purple Mountain Obs. || — || align=right | 32 km || 
|-id=633 bgcolor=#fefefe
| 2633 Bishop ||  ||  || November 24, 1981 || Anderson Mesa || E. Bowell || — || align=right | 7.0 km || 
|-id=634 bgcolor=#d6d6d6
| 2634 James Bradley || 1982 DL ||  || February 21, 1982 || Anderson Mesa || E. Bowell || 7:4 || align=right | 34 km || 
|-id=635 bgcolor=#fefefe
| 2635 Huggins || 1982 DS ||  || February 21, 1982 || Anderson Mesa || E. Bowell || FLO || align=right | 8.5 km || 
|-id=636 bgcolor=#d6d6d6
| 2636 Lassell || 1982 DZ ||  || February 20, 1982 || Anderson Mesa || E. Bowell || — || align=right | 14 km || 
|-id=637 bgcolor=#fefefe
| 2637 Bobrovnikoff || A919 SB ||  || September 22, 1919 || Heidelberg || K. Reinmuth || — || align=right | 6.2 km || 
|-id=638 bgcolor=#E9E9E9
| 2638 Gadolin || 1939 SG ||  || September 19, 1939 || Turku || Y. Väisälä || MAR || align=right | 12 km || 
|-id=639 bgcolor=#fefefe
| 2639 Planman || 1940 GN ||  || April 9, 1940 || Turku || Y. Väisälä || — || align=right | 6.9 km || 
|-id=640 bgcolor=#fefefe
| 2640 Hällström || 1941 FN ||  || March 18, 1941 || Turku || L. Oterma || — || align=right | 7.4 km || 
|-id=641 bgcolor=#fefefe
| 2641 Lipschutz || 1949 GJ ||  || April 4, 1949 || Brooklyn || Indiana University || — || align=right | 8.1 km || 
|-id=642 bgcolor=#fefefe
| 2642 Vésale || 1961 RA ||  || September 14, 1961 || Uccle || S. Arend || CIM || align=right | 7.4 km || 
|-id=643 bgcolor=#fefefe
| 2643 Bernhard || 1973 SD ||  || September 19, 1973 || Palomar || T. Gehrels || PHO || align=right | 4.0 km || 
|-id=644 bgcolor=#fefefe
| 2644 Victor Jara ||  ||  || September 22, 1973 || Nauchnij || N. S. Chernykh || — || align=right | 5.9 km || 
|-id=645 bgcolor=#fefefe
| 2645 Daphne Plane || 1976 QD ||  || August 30, 1976 || Palomar || E. F. Helin || — || align=right | 16 km || 
|-id=646 bgcolor=#d6d6d6
| 2646 Abetti ||  ||  || March 13, 1977 || Nauchnij || N. S. Chernykh || EOS || align=right | 17 km || 
|-id=647 bgcolor=#fefefe
| 2647 Sova || 1980 SP ||  || September 29, 1980 || Kleť || Z. Vávrová || FLO || align=right | 7.6 km || 
|-id=648 bgcolor=#fefefe
| 2648 Owa || 1980 VJ ||  || November 8, 1980 || Anderson Mesa || E. Bowell || — || align=right | 5.9 km || 
|-id=649 bgcolor=#E9E9E9
| 2649 Oongaq || 1980 WA ||  || November 29, 1980 || Anderson Mesa || E. Bowell || — || align=right | 11 km || 
|-id=650 bgcolor=#E9E9E9
| 2650 Elinor || 1931 EG ||  || March 14, 1931 || Heidelberg || M. F. Wolf || — || align=right | 13 km || 
|-id=651 bgcolor=#d6d6d6
| 2651 Karen || 1949 QD ||  || August 28, 1949 || Johannesburg || E. L. Johnson || — || align=right | 24 km || 
|-id=652 bgcolor=#E9E9E9
| 2652 Yabuuti || 1953 GM ||  || April 7, 1953 || Heidelberg || K. Reinmuth || — || align=right | 7.2 km || 
|-id=653 bgcolor=#fefefe
| 2653 Principia || 1964 VP ||  || November 4, 1964 || Brooklyn || Indiana University || — || align=right | 9.9 km || 
|-id=654 bgcolor=#d6d6d6
| 2654 Ristenpart || 1968 OG ||  || July 18, 1968 || Cerro El Roble || C. Torres, S. Cofré || — || align=right | 16 km || 
|-id=655 bgcolor=#d6d6d6
| 2655 Guangxi || 1974 XX ||  || December 14, 1974 || Nanking || Purple Mountain Obs. || — || align=right | 27 km || 
|-id=656 bgcolor=#fefefe
| 2656 Evenkia ||  ||  || April 25, 1979 || Nauchnij || N. S. Chernykh || — || align=right | 6.1 km || 
|-id=657 bgcolor=#d6d6d6
| 2657 Bashkiria ||  ||  || September 23, 1979 || Nauchnij || N. S. Chernykh || THM || align=right | 21 km || 
|-id=658 bgcolor=#d6d6d6
| 2658 Gingerich || 1980 CK ||  || February 13, 1980 || Harvard Observatory || Harvard Obs. || — || align=right | 12 km || 
|-id=659 bgcolor=#d6d6d6
| 2659 Millis || 1981 JX ||  || May 5, 1981 || Anderson Mesa || E. Bowell || THM || align=right | 28 km || 
|-id=660 bgcolor=#E9E9E9
| 2660 Wasserman || 1982 FG ||  || March 21, 1982 || Anderson Mesa || E. Bowell || EUN || align=right | 9.2 km || 
|-id=661 bgcolor=#d6d6d6
| 2661 Bydžovský ||  ||  || March 23, 1982 || Kleť || Z. Vávrová || — || align=right | 27 km || 
|-id=662 bgcolor=#fefefe
| 2662 Kandinsky || 4021 P-L ||  || September 24, 1960 || Palomar || PLS || NYS || align=right | 11 km || 
|-id=663 bgcolor=#fefefe
| 2663 Miltiades || 6561 P-L ||  || September 24, 1960 || Palomar || PLS || — || align=right | 4.7 km || 
|-id=664 bgcolor=#fefefe
| 2664 Everhart || 1934 RR ||  || September 7, 1934 || Heidelberg || K. Reinmuth || NYS || align=right | 11 km || 
|-id=665 bgcolor=#fefefe
| 2665 Schrutka ||  ||  || February 24, 1938 || Heidelberg || A. Bohrmann || FLO || align=right | 6.0 km || 
|-id=666 bgcolor=#d6d6d6
| 2666 Gramme || 1951 TA ||  || October 8, 1951 || Uccle || S. Arend || — || align=right | 30 km || 
|-id=667 bgcolor=#d6d6d6
| 2667 Oikawa || 1967 UO ||  || October 30, 1967 || Hamburg-Bergedorf || L. Kohoutek || THM || align=right | 21 km || 
|-id=668 bgcolor=#fefefe
| 2668 Tataria || 1976 QV ||  || August 26, 1976 || Nauchnij || N. S. Chernykh || — || align=right | 5.4 km || 
|-id=669 bgcolor=#E9E9E9
| 2669 Shostakovich ||  ||  || December 16, 1976 || Nauchnij || L. I. Chernykh || PAE || align=right | 16 km || 
|-id=670 bgcolor=#d6d6d6
| 2670 Chuvashia ||  ||  || August 14, 1977 || Nauchnij || N. S. Chernykh || — || align=right | 21 km || 
|-id=671 bgcolor=#E9E9E9
| 2671 Abkhazia ||  ||  || August 21, 1977 || Nauchnij || N. S. Chernykh || — || align=right | 10 km || 
|-id=672 bgcolor=#E9E9E9
| 2672 Písek || 1979 KC ||  || May 31, 1979 || Kleť || J. Květoň || EUNslow || align=right | 23 km || 
|-id=673 bgcolor=#d6d6d6
| 2673 Lossignol || 1980 KN ||  || May 22, 1980 || La Silla || H. Debehogne || THM || align=right | 15 km || 
|-id=674 bgcolor=#C2FFFF
| 2674 Pandarus ||  ||  || January 27, 1982 || Harvard Observatory || Oak Ridge Observatory || L5 || align=right | 74 km || 
|-id=675 bgcolor=#fefefe
| 2675 Tolkien || 1982 GB ||  || April 14, 1982 || Anderson Mesa || M. Watt || slow || align=right | 11 km || 
|-id=676 bgcolor=#fefefe
| 2676 Aarhus || 1933 QV ||  || August 25, 1933 || Heidelberg || K. Reinmuth || — || align=right | 8.0 km || 
|-id=677 bgcolor=#d6d6d6
| 2677 Joan || 1935 FF ||  || March 25, 1935 || Nice || M. Laugier || EOS || align=right | 18 km || 
|-id=678 bgcolor=#fefefe
| 2678 Aavasaksa ||  ||  || February 24, 1938 || Turku || Y. Väisälä || slow || align=right | 8.4 km || 
|-id=679 bgcolor=#E9E9E9
| 2679 Kittisvaara || 1939 TG ||  || October 7, 1939 || Turku || Y. Väisälä || — || align=right | 10 km || 
|-id=680 bgcolor=#fefefe
| 2680 Mateo || 1975 NF ||  || July 1, 1975 || El Leoncito || Félix Aguilar Obs. || NYS || align=right | 6.5 km || 
|-id=681 bgcolor=#E9E9E9
| 2681 Ostrovskij ||  ||  || November 2, 1975 || Nauchnij || T. M. Smirnova || — || align=right | 13 km || 
|-id=682 bgcolor=#fefefe
| 2682 Soromundi ||  ||  || June 25, 1979 || Siding Spring || E. F. Helin, S. J. Bus || FLO || align=right | 5.3 km || 
|-id=683 bgcolor=#d6d6d6
| 2683 Brian ||  ||  || January 10, 1981 || Anderson Mesa || N. G. Thomas || — || align=right | 11 km || 
|-id=684 bgcolor=#d6d6d6
| 2684 Douglas ||  ||  || January 3, 1981 || Anderson Mesa || N. G. Thomas || EOS || align=right | 16 km || 
|-id=685 bgcolor=#E9E9E9
| 2685 Masursky || 1981 JN ||  || May 3, 1981 || Anderson Mesa || E. Bowell || EUN || align=right | 11 km || 
|-id=686 bgcolor=#d6d6d6
| 2686 Linda Susan ||  ||  || May 5, 1981 || Palomar || C. S. Shoemaker || EOS || align=right | 16 km || 
|-id=687 bgcolor=#E9E9E9
| 2687 Tortali || 1982 HG ||  || April 18, 1982 || Anderson Mesa || M. Watt || — || align=right | 14 km || 
|-id=688 bgcolor=#d6d6d6
| 2688 Halley ||  ||  || April 25, 1982 || Anderson Mesa || E. Bowell || THM || align=right | 22 km || 
|-id=689 bgcolor=#fefefe
| 2689 Bruxelles || 1935 CF ||  || February 3, 1935 || Uccle || S. Arend || FLO || align=right | 6.6 km || 
|-id=690 bgcolor=#d6d6d6
| 2690 Ristiina ||  ||  || February 24, 1938 || Turku || Y. Väisälä || — || align=right | 18 km || 
|-id=691 bgcolor=#fefefe
| 2691 Sersic || 1974 KB ||  || May 18, 1974 || El Leoncito || Félix Aguilar Obs. || moon || align=right | 5.4 km || 
|-id=692 bgcolor=#E9E9E9
| 2692 Chkalov ||  ||  || December 16, 1976 || Nauchnij || L. I. Chernykh || — || align=right | 16 km || 
|-id=693 bgcolor=#fefefe
| 2693 Yan'an ||  ||  || November 3, 1977 || Nanking || Purple Mountain Obs. || — || align=right | 7.0 km || 
|-id=694 bgcolor=#fefefe
| 2694 Pino Torinese ||  ||  || August 22, 1979 || La Silla || C.-I. Lagerkvist || — || align=right | 5.6 km || 
|-id=695 bgcolor=#E9E9E9
| 2695 Christabel || 1979 UE ||  || October 17, 1979 || Anderson Mesa || E. Bowell || — || align=right | 15 km || 
|-id=696 bgcolor=#fefefe
| 2696 Magion || 1980 HB ||  || April 16, 1980 || Kleť || L. Brožek || slow || align=right | 25 km || 
|-id=697 bgcolor=#d6d6d6
| 2697 Albina ||  ||  || October 9, 1969 || Nauchnij || B. A. Burnasheva || 7:4 || align=right | 52 km || 
|-id=698 bgcolor=#E9E9E9
| 2698 Azerbajdzhan || 1971 TZ ||  || October 11, 1971 || Nauchnij || Crimean Astrophysical Obs. || — || align=right | 15 km || 
|-id=699 bgcolor=#E9E9E9
| 2699 Kalinin || 1976 YX ||  || December 16, 1976 || Nauchnij || L. I. Chernykh || — || align=right | 13 km || 
|-id=700 bgcolor=#d6d6d6
| 2700 Baikonur ||  ||  || December 20, 1976 || Nauchnij || N. S. Chernykh || — || align=right | 12 km || 
|}

2701–2800 

|-bgcolor=#d6d6d6
| 2701 Cherson || 1978 RT ||  || September 1, 1978 || Nauchnij || N. S. Chernykh || — || align=right | 15 km || 
|-id=702 bgcolor=#d6d6d6
| 2702 Batrakov ||  ||  || September 26, 1978 || Nauchnij || L. V. Zhuravleva || 7:4 || align=right | 25 km || 
|-id=703 bgcolor=#fefefe
| 2703 Rodari ||  ||  || March 29, 1979 || Nauchnij || N. S. Chernykh || — || align=right | 5.6 km || 
|-id=704 bgcolor=#fefefe
| 2704 Julian Loewe ||  ||  || June 25, 1979 || Siding Spring || E. F. Helin, S. J. Bus || — || align=right | 5.2 km || 
|-id=705 bgcolor=#fefefe
| 2705 Wu ||  ||  || October 9, 1980 || Palomar || C. S. Shoemaker || slow || align=right | 6.2 km || 
|-id=706 bgcolor=#d6d6d6
| 2706 Borovský || 1980 VW ||  || November 11, 1980 || Kleť || Z. Vávrová || EOS || align=right | 15 km || 
|-id=707 bgcolor=#d6d6d6
| 2707 Ueferji ||  ||  || August 28, 1981 || La Silla || H. Debehogne || — || align=right | 26 km || 
|-id=708 bgcolor=#d6d6d6
| 2708 Burns || 1981 WT ||  || November 24, 1981 || Anderson Mesa || E. Bowell || THM || align=right | 20 km || 
|-id=709 bgcolor=#fefefe
| 2709 Sagan || 1982 FH ||  || March 21, 1982 || Anderson Mesa || E. Bowell || FLO || align=right | 6.6 km || 
|-id=710 bgcolor=#fefefe
| 2710 Veverka || 1982 FQ ||  || March 23, 1982 || Anderson Mesa || E. Bowell || NYS || align=right | 5.2 km || 
|-id=711 bgcolor=#d6d6d6
| 2711 Aleksandrov ||  ||  || August 31, 1978 || Nauchnij || N. S. Chernykh || EOS || align=right | 14 km || 
|-id=712 bgcolor=#fefefe
| 2712 Keaton || 1937 YD ||  || December 29, 1937 || Konkoly || G. Kulin || — || align=right | 5.3 km || 
|-id=713 bgcolor=#d6d6d6
| 2713 Luxembourg || 1938 EA ||  || February 19, 1938 || Uccle || E. Delporte || KOR || align=right | 15 km || 
|-id=714 bgcolor=#fefefe
| 2714 Matti || 1938 GC ||  || April 5, 1938 || Turku || H. Alikoski || — || align=right | 7.7 km || 
|-id=715 bgcolor=#E9E9E9
| 2715 Mielikki || 1938 US ||  || October 22, 1938 || Turku || Y. Väisälä || — || align=right | 13 km || 
|-id=716 bgcolor=#fefefe
| 2716 Tuulikki || 1939 TM ||  || October 7, 1939 || Turku || Y. Väisälä || V || align=right | 5.2 km || 
|-id=717 bgcolor=#fefefe
| 2717 Tellervo || 1940 WJ ||  || November 29, 1940 || Turku || L. Oterma || — || align=right | 9.0 km || 
|-id=718 bgcolor=#d6d6d6
| 2718 Handley || 1951 OM ||  || July 30, 1951 || Johannesburg || E. L. Johnson || THM || align=right | 25 km || 
|-id=719 bgcolor=#fefefe
| 2719 Suzhou || 1965 SU ||  || September 22, 1965 || Nanking || Purple Mountain Obs. || — || align=right | 6.8 km || 
|-id=720 bgcolor=#fefefe
| 2720 Pyotr Pervyj ||  ||  || September 6, 1972 || Nauchnij || L. V. Zhuravleva || NYS || align=right | 8.9 km || 
|-id=721 bgcolor=#d6d6d6
| 2721 Vsekhsvyatskij ||  ||  || September 22, 1973 || Nauchnij || N. S. Chernykh || THM || align=right | 18 km || 
|-id=722 bgcolor=#d6d6d6
| 2722 Abalakin ||  ||  || April 1, 1976 || Nauchnij || N. S. Chernykh || THM || align=right | 19 km || 
|-id=723 bgcolor=#d6d6d6
| 2723 Gorshkov ||  ||  || August 31, 1978 || Nauchnij || N. S. Chernykh || THM || align=right | 13 km || 
|-id=724 bgcolor=#d6d6d6
| 2724 Orlov ||  ||  || September 13, 1978 || Nauchnij || N. S. Chernykh || — || align=right | 21 km || 
|-id=725 bgcolor=#d6d6d6
| 2725 David Bender ||  ||  || November 7, 1978 || Palomar || E. F. Helin, S. J. Bus || — || align=right | 37 km || 
|-id=726 bgcolor=#d6d6d6
| 2726 Kotelnikov ||  ||  || September 22, 1979 || Nauchnij || N. S. Chernykh || KOR || align=right | 11 km || 
|-id=727 bgcolor=#E9E9E9
| 2727 Paton ||  ||  || September 22, 1979 || Nauchnij || N. S. Chernykh || — || align=right | 9.1 km || 
|-id=728 bgcolor=#fefefe
| 2728 Yatskiv ||  ||  || September 22, 1979 || Nauchnij || N. S. Chernykh || — || align=right | 15 km || 
|-id=729 bgcolor=#d6d6d6
| 2729 Urumqi ||  ||  || October 18, 1979 || Nanking || Purple Mountain Obs. || KOR || align=right | 15 km || 
|-id=730 bgcolor=#E9E9E9
| 2730 Barks || 1981 QH ||  || August 30, 1981 || Anderson Mesa || E. Bowell || — || align=right | 16 km || 
|-id=731 bgcolor=#d6d6d6
| 2731 Cucula || 1982 KJ ||  || May 21, 1982 || Zimmerwald || P. Wild || — || align=right | 45 km || 
|-id=732 bgcolor=#E9E9E9
| 2732 Witt || 1926 FG ||  || March 19, 1926 || Heidelberg || M. F. Wolf || WIT || align=right | 11 km || 
|-id=733 bgcolor=#fefefe
| 2733 Hamina || 1938 DQ ||  || February 22, 1938 || Turku || Y. Väisälä || — || align=right | 7.4 km || 
|-id=734 bgcolor=#d6d6d6
| 2734 Hašek ||  ||  || April 1, 1976 || Nauchnij || N. S. Chernykh || — || align=right | 25 km || 
|-id=735 bgcolor=#fefefe
| 2735 Ellen || 1977 RB ||  || September 13, 1977 || Palomar || S. J. Bus, T. Lauer || Hslow || align=right | 3.5 km || 
|-id=736 bgcolor=#fefefe
| 2736 Ops || 1979 OC ||  || July 23, 1979 || Anderson Mesa || E. Bowell || — || align=right | 4.0 km || 
|-id=737 bgcolor=#E9E9E9
| 2737 Kotka || 1938 DU ||  || February 22, 1938 || Turku || Y. Väisälä || — || align=right | 13 km || 
|-id=738 bgcolor=#E9E9E9
| 2738 Viracocha || 1940 EC ||  || March 12, 1940 || Konkoly || G. Kulin || — || align=right | 17 km || 
|-id=739 bgcolor=#fefefe
| 2739 Taguacipa ||  ||  || October 17, 1952 || Mount Wilson || J. L. Brady || — || align=right | 11 km || 
|-id=740 bgcolor=#d6d6d6
| 2740 Tsoj ||  ||  || September 26, 1974 || Nauchnij || L. V. Zhuravleva || EOS || align=right | 18 km || 
|-id=741 bgcolor=#E9E9E9
| 2741 Valdivia || 1975 XG ||  || December 1, 1975 || Cerro El Roble || C. Torres, S. Barros || — || align=right | 12 km || 
|-id=742 bgcolor=#d6d6d6
| 2742 Gibson ||  ||  || May 6, 1981 || Palomar || C. S. Shoemaker || KOR || align=right | 11 km || 
|-id=743 bgcolor=#E9E9E9
| 2743 Chengdu || 1965 WR ||  || November 21, 1965 || Nanking || Purple Mountain Obs. || EUN || align=right | 9.0 km || 
|-id=744 bgcolor=#FA8072
| 2744 Birgitta || 1975 RB ||  || September 4, 1975 || Kvistaberg || C.-I. Lagerkvist || — || align=right | 3.4 km || 
|-id=745 bgcolor=#fefefe
| 2745 San Martín ||  ||  || September 25, 1976 || El Leoncito || Félix Aguilar Obs. || PHO || align=right | 5.2 km || 
|-id=746 bgcolor=#fefefe
| 2746 Hissao ||  ||  || September 22, 1979 || Nauchnij || N. S. Chernykh || FLO || align=right | 5.2 km || 
|-id=747 bgcolor=#d6d6d6
| 2747 Český Krumlov || 1980 DW ||  || February 19, 1980 || Kleť || A. Mrkos || slow || align=right | 30 km || 
|-id=748 bgcolor=#E9E9E9
| 2748 Patrick Gene ||  ||  || May 5, 1981 || Palomar || C. S. Shoemaker || — || align=right | 8.5 km || 
|-id=749 bgcolor=#d6d6d6
| 2749 Walterhorn || 1937 TD ||  || October 11, 1937 || Heidelberg || K. Reinmuth || THM || align=right | 14 km || 
|-id=750 bgcolor=#fefefe
| 2750 Loviisa || 1940 YK ||  || December 30, 1940 || Turku || Y. Väisälä || FLOslow || align=right | 4.9 km || 
|-id=751 bgcolor=#fefefe
| 2751 Campbell || 1962 RP ||  || September 7, 1962 || Brooklyn || Indiana University || NYS || align=right | 6.9 km || 
|-id=752 bgcolor=#d6d6d6
| 2752 Wu Chien-Shiung || 1965 SP ||  || September 20, 1965 || Nanking || Purple Mountain Obs. || EOS || align=right | 15 km || 
|-id=753 bgcolor=#E9E9E9
| 2753 Duncan || 1966 DH ||  || February 18, 1966 || Brooklyn || Indiana University || — || align=right | 19 km || 
|-id=754 bgcolor=#fefefe
| 2754 Efimov || 1966 PD ||  || August 13, 1966 || Nauchnij || T. M. Smirnova || moon || align=right | 5.5 km || 
|-id=755 bgcolor=#d6d6d6
| 2755 Avicenna ||  ||  || September 26, 1973 || Nauchnij || L. I. Chernykh || — || align=right | 12 km || 
|-id=756 bgcolor=#E9E9E9
| 2756 Dzhangar ||  ||  || September 19, 1974 || Nauchnij || L. I. Chernykh || — || align=right | 5.3 km || 
|-id=757 bgcolor=#d6d6d6
| 2757 Crisser || 1977 VN ||  || November 11, 1977 || Cerro El Roble || S. Barros || THM || align=right | 20 km || 
|-id=758 bgcolor=#E9E9E9
| 2758 Cordelia || 1978 RF ||  || September 1, 1978 || Nauchnij || N. S. Chernykh || — || align=right | 10 km || 
|-id=759 bgcolor=#C2FFFF
| 2759 Idomeneus || 1980 GC ||  || April 14, 1980 || Anderson Mesa || E. Bowell || L4slow || align=right | 54 km || 
|-id=760 bgcolor=#d6d6d6
| 2760 Kacha ||  ||  || October 8, 1980 || Nauchnij || L. V. Zhuravleva || 3:2 || align=right | 58 km || 
|-id=761 bgcolor=#d6d6d6
| 2761 Eddington || 1981 AE ||  || January 1, 1981 || Anderson Mesa || E. Bowell || — || align=right | 16 km || 
|-id=762 bgcolor=#fefefe
| 2762 Fowler || 1981 AT ||  || January 14, 1981 || Anderson Mesa || E. Bowell || — || align=right | 4.5 km || 
|-id=763 bgcolor=#fefefe
| 2763 Jeans || 1982 OG ||  || July 24, 1982 || Anderson Mesa || E. Bowell || — || align=right | 7.5 km || 
|-id=764 bgcolor=#fefefe
| 2764 Moeller || 1981 CN ||  || February 8, 1981 || Anderson Mesa || N. G. Thomas || — || align=right | 5.3 km || 
|-id=765 bgcolor=#d6d6d6
| 2765 Dinant || 1981 EY ||  || March 4, 1981 || La Silla || H. Debehogne, G. DeSanctis || — || align=right | 24 km || 
|-id=766 bgcolor=#E9E9E9
| 2766 Leeuwenhoek ||  ||  || March 23, 1982 || Kleť || Z. Vávrová || — || align=right | 7.1 km || 
|-id=767 bgcolor=#d6d6d6
| 2767 Takenouchi || 1967 UM ||  || October 30, 1967 || Hamburg-Bergedorf || L. Kohoutek || EOS || align=right | 14 km || 
|-id=768 bgcolor=#fefefe
| 2768 Gorky ||  ||  || September 6, 1972 || Nauchnij || L. V. Zhuravleva || FLO || align=right | 8.9 km || 
|-id=769 bgcolor=#d6d6d6
| 2769 Mendeleev ||  ||  || April 1, 1976 || Nauchnij || N. S. Chernykh || THM || align=right | 14 km || 
|-id=770 bgcolor=#fefefe
| 2770 Tsvet ||  ||  || September 19, 1977 || Nauchnij || N. S. Chernykh || — || align=right | 7.2 km || 
|-id=771 bgcolor=#E9E9E9
| 2771 Polzunov ||  ||  || September 26, 1978 || Nauchnij || L. V. Zhuravleva || — || align=right | 11 km || 
|-id=772 bgcolor=#fefefe
| 2772 Dugan || 1979 XE ||  || December 14, 1979 || Anderson Mesa || E. Bowell || slow || align=right | 9.6 km || 
|-id=773 bgcolor=#fefefe
| 2773 Brooks ||  ||  || May 6, 1981 || Palomar || C. S. Shoemaker || — || align=right | 13 km || 
|-id=774 bgcolor=#d6d6d6
| 2774 Tenojoki || 1942 TJ ||  || October 3, 1942 || Turku || L. Oterma || — || align=right | 36 km || 
|-id=775 bgcolor=#fefefe
| 2775 Odishaw ||  ||  || October 14, 1953 || Brooklyn || Indiana University || NYS || align=right | 4.9 km || 
|-id=776 bgcolor=#fefefe
| 2776 Baikal ||  ||  || September 25, 1976 || Nauchnij || N. S. Chernykh || ERI || align=right | 19 km || 
|-id=777 bgcolor=#fefefe
| 2777 Shukshin ||  ||  || September 24, 1979 || Nauchnij || N. S. Chernykh || FLO || align=right | 6.4 km || 
|-id=778 bgcolor=#fefefe
| 2778 Tangshan || 1979 XP ||  || December 14, 1979 || Nanking || Purple Mountain Obs. || — || align=right | 13 km || 
|-id=779 bgcolor=#fefefe
| 2779 Mary || 1981 CX ||  || February 6, 1981 || Anderson Mesa || N. G. Thomas || — || align=right | 6.3 km || 
|-id=780 bgcolor=#fefefe
| 2780 Monnig ||  ||  || February 28, 1981 || Siding Spring || S. J. Bus || FLO || align=right | 4.8 km || 
|-id=781 bgcolor=#d6d6d6
| 2781 Kleczek || 1982 QH ||  || August 19, 1982 || Kleť || Z. Vávrová || THM || align=right | 21 km || 
|-id=782 bgcolor=#E9E9E9
| 2782 Leonidas || 2605 P-L ||  || September 24, 1960 || Palomar || PLS || VIB || align=right | 11 km || 
|-id=783 bgcolor=#E9E9E9
| 2783 Chernyshevskij ||  ||  || September 14, 1974 || Nauchnij || N. S. Chernykh || — || align=right | 6.2 km || 
|-id=784 bgcolor=#fefefe
| 2784 Domeyko || 1975 GA ||  || April 15, 1975 || Cerro El Roble || C. Torres || FLO || align=right | 6.4 km || 
|-id=785 bgcolor=#d6d6d6
| 2785 Sedov ||  ||  || August 31, 1978 || Nauchnij || N. S. Chernykh || KOR || align=right | 9.4 km || 
|-id=786 bgcolor=#E9E9E9
| 2786 Grinevia ||  ||  || September 6, 1978 || Nauchnij || N. S. Chernykh || EUN || align=right | 10 km || 
|-id=787 bgcolor=#d6d6d6
| 2787 Tovarishch ||  ||  || September 13, 1978 || Nauchnij || N. S. Chernykh || EOS || align=right | 20 km || 
|-id=788 bgcolor=#E9E9E9
| 2788 Andenne || 1981 EL ||  || March 1, 1981 || La Silla || H. Debehogne, G. DeSanctis || — || align=right | 6.9 km || 
|-id=789 bgcolor=#fefefe
| 2789 Foshan || 1956 XA ||  || December 6, 1956 || Nanking || Purple Mountain Obs. || FLO || align=right | 4.8 km || 
|-id=790 bgcolor=#E9E9E9
| 2790 Needham ||  ||  || October 19, 1965 || Nanking || Purple Mountain Obs. || — || align=right | 7.9 km || 
|-id=791 bgcolor=#fefefe
| 2791 Paradise || 1977 CA ||  || February 13, 1977 || Palomar || S. J. Bus || — || align=right | 8.4 km || 
|-id=792 bgcolor=#fefefe
| 2792 Ponomarev ||  ||  || March 13, 1977 || Nauchnij || N. S. Chernykh || slow || align=right | 12 km || 
|-id=793 bgcolor=#d6d6d6
| 2793 Valdaj || 1977 QV ||  || August 19, 1977 || Nauchnij || N. S. Chernykh || ALA || align=right | 27 km || 
|-id=794 bgcolor=#fefefe
| 2794 Kulik ||  ||  || August 8, 1978 || Nauchnij || N. S. Chernykh || KLI || align=right | 7.3 km || 
|-id=795 bgcolor=#fefefe
| 2795 Lepage || 1979 YM ||  || December 16, 1979 || La Silla || H. Debehogne, E. R. Netto || V || align=right | 5.9 km || 
|-id=796 bgcolor=#E9E9E9
| 2796 Kron || 1980 EC ||  || March 13, 1980 || Anderson Mesa || E. Bowell || EUN || align=right | 8.6 km || 
|-id=797 bgcolor=#C2FFFF
| 2797 Teucer || 1981 LK ||  || June 4, 1981 || Anderson Mesa || E. Bowell || L4 || align=right | 89 km || 
|-id=798 bgcolor=#fefefe
| 2798 Vergilius || 2009 P-L ||  || September 24, 1960 || Palomar || PLS || — || align=right | 4.8 km || 
|-id=799 bgcolor=#fefefe
| 2799 Justus || 3071 P-L ||  || September 25, 1960 || Palomar || PLS || V || align=right | 3.3 km || 
|-id=800 bgcolor=#d6d6d6
| 2800 Ovidius || 4585 P-L ||  || September 24, 1960 || Palomar || PLS || THM || align=right | 15 km || 
|}

2801–2900 

|-bgcolor=#E9E9E9
| 2801 Huygens ||  ||  || September 28, 1935 || Johannesburg || H. van Gent || GEF || align=right | 12 km || 
|-id=802 bgcolor=#d6d6d6
| 2802 Weisell || 1939 BU ||  || January 19, 1939 || Turku || Y. Väisälä || — || align=right | 19 km || 
|-id=803 bgcolor=#d6d6d6
| 2803 Vilho || 1940 WG ||  || November 29, 1940 || Turku || L. Oterma || THM || align=right | 21 km || 
|-id=804 bgcolor=#d6d6d6
| 2804 Yrjö || 1941 HF ||  || April 19, 1941 || Turku || L. Oterma || EOS || align=right | 18 km || 
|-id=805 bgcolor=#E9E9E9
| 2805 Kalle || 1941 UM ||  || October 15, 1941 || Turku || L. Oterma || — || align=right | 17 km || 
|-id=806 bgcolor=#fefefe
| 2806 Graz || 1953 GG ||  || April 7, 1953 || Heidelberg || K. Reinmuth || — || align=right | 13 km || 
|-id=807 bgcolor=#E9E9E9
| 2807 Karl Marx ||  ||  || October 15, 1969 || Nauchnij || L. I. Chernykh || DOR || align=right | 17 km || 
|-id=808 bgcolor=#d6d6d6
| 2808 Belgrano || 1976 HS ||  || April 23, 1976 || El Leoncito || Félix Aguilar Obs. || EOS || align=right | 15 km || 
|-id=809 bgcolor=#fefefe
| 2809 Vernadskij ||  ||  || August 31, 1978 || Nauchnij || N. S. Chernykh || NYS || align=right | 12 km || 
|-id=810 bgcolor=#E9E9E9
| 2810 Lev Tolstoj ||  ||  || September 13, 1978 || Nauchnij || N. S. Chernykh || EUN || align=right | 7.9 km || 
|-id=811 bgcolor=#d6d6d6
| 2811 Střemchoví || 1980 JA ||  || May 10, 1980 || Kleť || A. Mrkos || KOR || align=right | 12 km || 
|-id=812 bgcolor=#fefefe
| 2812 Scaltriti || 1981 FN ||  || March 30, 1981 || Anderson Mesa || E. Bowell || FLO || align=right | 6.0 km || 
|-id=813 bgcolor=#d6d6d6
| 2813 Zappalà || 1981 WZ ||  || November 24, 1981 || Anderson Mesa || E. Bowell || — || align=right | 32 km || 
|-id=814 bgcolor=#d6d6d6
| 2814 Vieira ||  ||  || March 18, 1982 || La Silla || H. Debehogne || KOR || align=right | 9.9 km || 
|-id=815 bgcolor=#fefefe
| 2815 Soma || 1982 RL ||  || September 15, 1982 || Anderson Mesa || E. Bowell || FLOmoon || align=right | 6.6 km || 
|-id=816 bgcolor=#E9E9E9
| 2816 Pien || 1982 SO ||  || September 22, 1982 || Anderson Mesa || E. Bowell || — || align=right | 28 km || 
|-id=817 bgcolor=#fefefe
| 2817 Perec || 1982 UJ ||  || October 17, 1982 || Anderson Mesa || E. Bowell || — || align=right | 10 km || 
|-id=818 bgcolor=#fefefe
| 2818 Juvenalis || 2580 P-L ||  || September 24, 1960 || Palomar || PLS || NYS || align=right | 3.9 km || 
|-id=819 bgcolor=#E9E9E9
| 2819 Ensor || 1933 UR ||  || October 20, 1933 || Uccle || E. Delporte || — || align=right | 9.7 km || 
|-id=820 bgcolor=#fefefe
| 2820 Iisalmi || 1942 RU ||  || September 8, 1942 || Turku || Y. Väisälä || FLO || align=right | 6.8 km || 
|-id=821 bgcolor=#fefefe
| 2821 Slávka || 1978 SQ ||  || September 24, 1978 || Kleť || Z. Vávrová || — || align=right | 3.9 km || 
|-id=822 bgcolor=#E9E9E9
| 2822 Sacajawea || 1980 EG ||  || March 14, 1980 || Anderson Mesa || E. Bowell || EUN || align=right | 8.7 km || 
|-id=823 bgcolor=#fefefe
| 2823 van der Laan || 2010 P-L ||  || September 24, 1960 || Palomar || PLS || — || align=right | 5.4 km || 
|-id=824 bgcolor=#fefefe
| 2824 Franke || 1934 CZ ||  || February 4, 1934 || Heidelberg || K. Reinmuth || — || align=right | 6.7 km || 
|-id=825 bgcolor=#fefefe
| 2825 Crosby ||  ||  || September 19, 1938 || Johannesburg || C. Jackson || moon || align=right | 5.1 km || 
|-id=826 bgcolor=#d6d6d6
| 2826 Ahti || 1939 UJ ||  || October 18, 1939 || Turku || Y. Väisälä || — || align=right | 40 km || 
|-id=827 bgcolor=#fefefe
| 2827 Vellamo || 1942 CC ||  || February 11, 1942 || Turku || L. Oterma || — || align=right | 9.3 km || 
|-id=828 bgcolor=#fefefe
| 2828 Iku-Turso || 1942 DL ||  || February 18, 1942 || Turku || L. Oterma || — || align=right | 7.3 km || 
|-id=829 bgcolor=#d6d6d6
| 2829 Bobhope || 1948 PK ||  || August 9, 1948 || Johannesburg || E. L. Johnson || MEL || align=right | 41 km || 
|-id=830 bgcolor=#fefefe
| 2830 Greenwich || 1980 GA ||  || April 14, 1980 || Anderson Mesa || E. Bowell || PHO || align=right | 7.9 km || 
|-id=831 bgcolor=#fefefe
| 2831 Stevin || 1930 SZ ||  || September 17, 1930 || Johannesburg || H. van Gent || — || align=right | 5.5 km || 
|-id=832 bgcolor=#fefefe
| 2832 Lada ||  ||  || March 6, 1975 || Nauchnij || N. S. Chernykh || — || align=right | 6.1 km || 
|-id=833 bgcolor=#d6d6d6
| 2833 Radishchev ||  ||  || August 9, 1978 || Nauchnij || L. I. Chernykh, N. S. Chernykh || KOR || align=right | 14 km || 
|-id=834 bgcolor=#E9E9E9
| 2834 Christy Carol ||  ||  || October 9, 1980 || Palomar || C. S. Shoemaker || — || align=right | 11 km || 
|-id=835 bgcolor=#E9E9E9
| 2835 Ryoma || 1982 WF ||  || November 20, 1982 || Geisei || T. Seki || — || align=right | 24 km || 
|-id=836 bgcolor=#d6d6d6
| 2836 Sobolev || 1978 YQ ||  || December 22, 1978 || Nauchnij || N. S. Chernykh || EOS || align=right | 19 km || 
|-id=837 bgcolor=#d6d6d6
| 2837 Griboedov ||  ||  || October 13, 1971 || Nauchnij || L. I. Chernykh || KOR || align=right | 12 km || 
|-id=838 bgcolor=#fefefe
| 2838 Takase ||  ||  || October 26, 1971 || Hamburg-Bergedorf || L. Kohoutek || — || align=right | 3.9 km || 
|-id=839 bgcolor=#fefefe
| 2839 Annette || 1929 TP ||  || October 5, 1929 || Flagstaff || C. W. Tombaugh || FLO || align=right | 7.3 km || 
|-id=840 bgcolor=#fefefe
| 2840 Kallavesi || 1941 UP ||  || October 15, 1941 || Turku || L. Oterma || — || align=right | 7.7 km || 
|-id=841 bgcolor=#fefefe
| 2841 Puijo || 1943 DM ||  || February 26, 1943 || Turku || L. Oterma || FLO || align=right | 6.3 km || 
|-id=842 bgcolor=#E9E9E9
| 2842 Unsöld || 1950 OD ||  || July 25, 1950 || Brooklyn || Indiana University || EUN || align=right | 14 km || 
|-id=843 bgcolor=#fefefe
| 2843 Yeti || 1975 XQ ||  || December 7, 1975 || Zimmerwald || P. Wild || slow || align=right | 7.6 km || 
|-id=844 bgcolor=#fefefe
| 2844 Hess || 1981 JP ||  || May 3, 1981 || Anderson Mesa || E. Bowell || — || align=right | 6.3 km || 
|-id=845 bgcolor=#fefefe
| 2845 Franklinken || 1981 OF ||  || July 26, 1981 || Anderson Mesa || E. Bowell || FLOslow || align=right | 5.4 km || 
|-id=846 bgcolor=#d6d6d6
| 2846 Ylppö || 1942 CJ ||  || February 12, 1942 || Turku || L. Oterma || — || align=right | 28 km || 
|-id=847 bgcolor=#fefefe
| 2847 Parvati ||  ||  || February 1, 1959 || Flagstaff || Lowell Obs. || — || align=right | 6.9 km || 
|-id=848 bgcolor=#d6d6d6
| 2848 ASP || 1959 VF ||  || November 8, 1959 || Brooklyn || Indiana University || THM || align=right | 26 km || 
|-id=849 bgcolor=#E9E9E9
| 2849 Shklovskij ||  ||  || April 1, 1976 || Nauchnij || N. S. Chernykh || — || align=right | 14 km || 
|-id=850 bgcolor=#fefefe
| 2850 Mozhaiskij ||  ||  || October 2, 1978 || Nauchnij || L. V. Zhuravleva || — || align=right | 7.0 km || 
|-id=851 bgcolor=#fefefe
| 2851 Harbin ||  ||  || October 30, 1978 || Nanking || Purple Mountain Obs. || — || align=right | 8.8 km || 
|-id=852 bgcolor=#E9E9E9
| 2852 Declercq ||  ||  || August 23, 1981 || La Silla || H. Debehogne || AST || align=right | 13 km || 
|-id=853 bgcolor=#fefefe
| 2853 Harvill || 1963 RG ||  || September 14, 1963 || Brooklyn || Indiana University || FLO || align=right | 7.0 km || 
|-id=854 bgcolor=#fefefe
| 2854 Rawson || 1964 JE ||  || May 6, 1964 || Córdoba || D. McLeish || — || align=right | 7.2 km || 
|-id=855 bgcolor=#fefefe
| 2855 Bastian ||  ||  || October 10, 1931 || Heidelberg || K. Reinmuth || — || align=right | 9.0 km || 
|-id=856 bgcolor=#d6d6d6
| 2856 Röser || 1933 GB ||  || April 14, 1933 || Heidelberg || K. Reinmuth || — || align=right | 24 km || 
|-id=857 bgcolor=#fefefe
| 2857 NOT || 1942 DA ||  || February 17, 1942 || Turku || L. Oterma || — || align=right | 9.3 km || 
|-id=858 bgcolor=#fefefe
| 2858 Carlosporter || 1975 XB ||  || December 1, 1975 || Cerro El Roble || C. Torres, S. Barros || FLO || align=right | 4.4 km || 
|-id=859 bgcolor=#fefefe
| 2859 Paganini ||  ||  || September 5, 1978 || Nauchnij || N. S. Chernykh || — || align=right | 4.3 km || 
|-id=860 bgcolor=#fefefe
| 2860 Pasacentennium || 1978 TA ||  || October 8, 1978 || Palomar || E. F. Helin || — || align=right | 6.8 km || 
|-id=861 bgcolor=#fefefe
| 2861 Lambrecht ||  ||  || November 3, 1981 || Tautenburg Observatory || F. Börngen, K. Kirsch || — || align=right | 17 km || 
|-id=862 bgcolor=#fefefe
| 2862 Vavilov || 1977 JP ||  || May 15, 1977 || Nauchnij || N. S. Chernykh || slow || align=right | 6.0 km || 
|-id=863 bgcolor=#d6d6d6
| 2863 Ben Mayer ||  ||  || August 30, 1981 || Anderson Mesa || E. Bowell || THM || align=right | 18 km || 
|-id=864 bgcolor=#E9E9E9
| 2864 Soderblom || 1983 AZ ||  || January 12, 1983 || Anderson Mesa || B. A. Skiff || — || align=right | 16 km || 
|-id=865 bgcolor=#E9E9E9
| 2865 Laurel || 1935 OK ||  || July 31, 1935 || Johannesburg || C. Jackson || MAR || align=right | 25 km || 
|-id=866 bgcolor=#d6d6d6
| 2866 Hardy || 1961 TA ||  || October 7, 1961 || Uccle || S. Arend || — || align=right | 11 km || 
|-id=867 bgcolor=#fefefe
| 2867 Šteins || 1969 VC ||  || November 4, 1969 || Nauchnij || N. S. Chernykh || — || align=right | 5.2 km || 
|-id=868 bgcolor=#E9E9E9
| 2868 Upupa || 1972 UA ||  || October 30, 1972 || Zimmerwald || P. Wild || — || align=right | 12 km || 
|-id=869 bgcolor=#E9E9E9
| 2869 Nepryadva ||  ||  || September 7, 1980 || Nauchnij || N. S. Chernykh || EUN || align=right | 8.6 km || 
|-id=870 bgcolor=#fefefe
| 2870 Haupt || 1981 LD ||  || June 4, 1981 || Anderson Mesa || E. Bowell || NYSslow || align=right | 15 km || 
|-id=871 bgcolor=#fefefe
| 2871 Schober ||  ||  || August 30, 1981 || Anderson Mesa || E. Bowell || — || align=right | 6.8 km || 
|-id=872 bgcolor=#E9E9E9
| 2872 Gentelec || 1981 RU ||  || September 5, 1981 || Harvard Observatory || Oak Ridge Observatory || — || align=right | 14 km || 
|-id=873 bgcolor=#fefefe
| 2873 Binzel || 1982 FR ||  || March 28, 1982 || Anderson Mesa || E. Bowell || FLOmoon || align=right | 6.4 km || 
|-id=874 bgcolor=#fefefe
| 2874 Jim Young || 1982 TH ||  || October 13, 1982 || Anderson Mesa || E. Bowell || FLOslow || align=right | 6.6 km || 
|-id=875 bgcolor=#E9E9E9
| 2875 Lagerkvist || 1983 CL ||  || February 11, 1983 || Anderson Mesa || E. Bowell || GEF || align=right | 9.5 km || 
|-id=876 bgcolor=#E9E9E9
| 2876 Aeschylus || 6558 P-L ||  || September 24, 1960 || Palomar || PLS || — || align=right | 6.8 km || 
|-id=877 bgcolor=#d6d6d6
| 2877 Likhachev ||  ||  || October 8, 1969 || Nauchnij || L. I. Chernykh || THM || align=right | 17 km || 
|-id=878 bgcolor=#d6d6d6
| 2878 Panacea || 1980 RX ||  || September 7, 1980 || Anderson Mesa || E. Bowell || — || align=right | 16 km || 
|-id=879 bgcolor=#E9E9E9
| 2879 Shimizu ||  ||  || February 14, 1932 || Heidelberg || K. Reinmuth || — || align=right | 22 km || 
|-id=880 bgcolor=#fefefe
| 2880 Nihondaira || 1983 CA ||  || February 8, 1983 || Geisei || T. Seki || FLO || align=right | 7.1 km || 
|-id=881 bgcolor=#fefefe
| 2881 Meiden ||  ||  || January 12, 1983 || Anderson Mesa || B. A. Skiff || moon || align=right | 5.7 km || 
|-id=882 bgcolor=#d6d6d6
| 2882 Tedesco || 1981 OG ||  || July 26, 1981 || Anderson Mesa || E. Bowell || THM || align=right | 22 km || 
|-id=883 bgcolor=#fefefe
| 2883 Barabashov ||  ||  || September 13, 1978 || Nauchnij || N. S. Chernykh || moon || align=right | 4.9 km || 
|-id=884 bgcolor=#d6d6d6
| 2884 Reddish ||  ||  || March 2, 1981 || Siding Spring || S. J. Bus || THM || align=right | 19 km || 
|-id=885 bgcolor=#fefefe
| 2885 Palva || 1939 TC ||  || October 7, 1939 || Turku || Y. Väisälä || — || align=right | 4.6 km || 
|-id=886 bgcolor=#fefefe
| 2886 Tinkaping || 1965 YG ||  || December 20, 1965 || Nanking || Purple Mountain Obs. || — || align=right | 5.8 km || 
|-id=887 bgcolor=#fefefe
| 2887 Krinov ||  ||  || August 22, 1977 || Nauchnij || N. S. Chernykh || FLO || align=right | 6.2 km || 
|-id=888 bgcolor=#fefefe
| 2888 Hodgson || 1982 TO ||  || October 13, 1982 || Anderson Mesa || E. Bowell || — || align=right | 5.4 km || 
|-id=889 bgcolor=#d6d6d6
| 2889 Brno ||  ||  || November 17, 1981 || Kleť || A. Mrkos || EOS || align=right | 17 km || 
|-id=890 bgcolor=#fefefe
| 2890 Vilyujsk ||  ||  || September 26, 1978 || Nauchnij || L. V. Zhuravleva || FLO || align=right | 8.0 km || 
|-id=891 bgcolor=#d6d6d6
| 2891 McGetchin || 1980 MD ||  || June 18, 1980 || Palomar || C. S. Shoemaker || 7:4 || align=right | 35 km || 
|-id=892 bgcolor=#d6d6d6
| 2892 Filipenko ||  ||  || January 13, 1983 || Nauchnij || L. G. Karachkina || — || align=right | 69 km || 
|-id=893 bgcolor=#C2FFFF
| 2893 Peiroos || 1975 QD ||  || August 30, 1975 || El Leoncito || Félix Aguilar Obs. || L5 || align=right | 87 km || 
|-id=894 bgcolor=#d6d6d6
| 2894 Kakhovka ||  ||  || September 27, 1978 || Nauchnij || L. I. Chernykh || THM || align=right | 13 km || 
|-id=895 bgcolor=#C2FFFF
| 2895 Memnon ||  ||  || January 10, 1981 || Anderson Mesa || N. G. Thomas || L5 || align=right | 57 km || 
|-id=896 bgcolor=#fefefe
| 2896 Preiss || 1931 RN ||  || September 15, 1931 || Heidelberg || K. Reinmuth || FLO || align=right | 7.1 km || 
|-id=897 bgcolor=#fefefe
| 2897 Ole Römer || 1932 CK ||  || February 5, 1932 || Heidelberg || K. Reinmuth || FLO || align=right | 5.2 km || 
|-id=898 bgcolor=#E9E9E9
| 2898 Neuvo || 1938 DN ||  || February 20, 1938 || Turku || Y. Väisälä || — || align=right | 11 km || 
|-id=899 bgcolor=#fefefe
| 2899 Runrun Shaw ||  ||  || October 8, 1964 || Nanking || Purple Mountain Obs. || — || align=right | 4.8 km || 
|-id=900 bgcolor=#d6d6d6
| 2900 Luboš Perek || 1972 AR ||  || January 14, 1972 || Hamburg-Bergedorf || L. Kohoutek || EOS || align=right | 13 km || 
|}

2901–3000 

|-bgcolor=#d6d6d6
| 2901 Bagehot || 1973 DP ||  || February 27, 1973 || Hamburg-Bergedorf || L. Kohoutek || KOR || align=right | 13 km || 
|-id=902 bgcolor=#fefefe
| 2902 Westerlund ||  ||  || March 16, 1980 || La Silla || C.-I. Lagerkvist || FLO || align=right | 4.1 km || 
|-id=903 bgcolor=#E9E9E9
| 2903 Zhuhai ||  ||  || October 23, 1981 || Nanking || Purple Mountain Obs. || — || align=right | 14 km || 
|-id=904 bgcolor=#E9E9E9
| 2904 Millman || 1981 YB ||  || December 20, 1981 || Anderson Mesa || E. Bowell || — || align=right | 15 km || 
|-id=905 bgcolor=#E9E9E9
| 2905 Plaskett ||  ||  || January 24, 1982 || Anderson Mesa || E. Bowell || GEF || align=right | 10 km || 
|-id=906 bgcolor=#d6d6d6
| 2906 Caltech ||  ||  || January 13, 1983 || Palomar || C. S. Shoemaker || Tj (2.98) || align=right | 59 km || 
|-id=907 bgcolor=#d6d6d6
| 2907 Nekrasov ||  ||  || October 3, 1975 || Nauchnij || L. I. Chernykh || EOS || align=right | 17 km || 
|-id=908 bgcolor=#d6d6d6
| 2908 Shimoyama || 1981 WA ||  || November 18, 1981 || Tōkai || T. Furuta || — || align=right | 30 km || 
|-id=909 bgcolor=#d6d6d6
| 2909 Hoshi-no-ie || 1983 JA ||  || May 9, 1983 || Chirorin || S. Sei || EOS || align=right | 21 km || 
|-id=910 bgcolor=#fefefe
| 2910 Yoshkar-Ola ||  ||  || October 11, 1980 || Nauchnij || N. S. Chernykh || — || align=right | 4.1 km || 
|-id=911 bgcolor=#E9E9E9
| 2911 Miahelena || 1938 GJ ||  || April 8, 1938 || Turku || H. Alikoski || GEF || align=right | 12 km || 
|-id=912 bgcolor=#fefefe
| 2912 Lapalma || 1942 DM ||  || February 18, 1942 || Turku || L. Oterma || — || align=right | 6.5 km || 
|-id=913 bgcolor=#E9E9E9
| 2913 Horta || 1931 TK ||  || October 12, 1931 || Uccle || E. Delporte || — || align=right | 10 km || 
|-id=914 bgcolor=#fefefe
| 2914 Glärnisch || 1965 SB ||  || September 19, 1965 || Zimmerwald || P. Wild || — || align=right | 6.0 km || 
|-id=915 bgcolor=#E9E9E9
| 2915 Moskvina ||  ||  || August 22, 1977 || Nauchnij || N. S. Chernykh || EUNfast || align=right | 5.4 km || 
|-id=916 bgcolor=#fefefe
| 2916 Voronveliya ||  ||  || August 8, 1978 || Nauchnij || N. S. Chernykh || FLO || align=right | 4.9 km || 
|-id=917 bgcolor=#E9E9E9
| 2917 Sawyer Hogg || 1980 RR ||  || September 2, 1980 || Anderson Mesa || E. Bowell || — || align=right | 9.6 km || 
|-id=918 bgcolor=#d6d6d6
| 2918 Salazar ||  ||  || October 9, 1980 || Palomar || C. S. Shoemaker || THM || align=right | 20 km || 
|-id=919 bgcolor=#d6d6d6
| 2919 Dali ||  ||  || March 2, 1981 || Siding Spring || S. J. Bus || THM || align=right | 19 km || 
|-id=920 bgcolor=#C2FFFF
| 2920 Automedon || 1981 JR ||  || May 3, 1981 || Anderson Mesa || E. Bowell || L4 || align=right | 89 km || 
|-id=921 bgcolor=#d6d6d6
| 2921 Sophocles || 6525 P-L ||  || September 24, 1960 || Palomar || PLS || THM || align=right | 11 km || 
|-id=922 bgcolor=#fefefe
| 2922 Dikanʹka ||  ||  || April 1, 1976 || Nauchnij || N. S. Chernykh || — || align=right | 5.7 km || 
|-id=923 bgcolor=#fefefe
| 2923 Schuyler || 1977 DA ||  || February 22, 1977 || Harvard Observatory || Harvard Obs. || — || align=right | 9.3 km || 
|-id=924 bgcolor=#d6d6d6
| 2924 Mitake-mura ||  ||  || February 18, 1977 || Kiso || H. Kosai, K. Furukawa || KOR || align=right | 11 km || 
|-id=925 bgcolor=#fefefe
| 2925 Beatty ||  ||  || November 7, 1978 || Palomar || E. F. Helin, S. J. Bus || — || align=right | 7.1 km || 
|-id=926 bgcolor=#fefefe
| 2926 Caldeira || 1980 KG ||  || May 22, 1980 || La Silla || H. Debehogne || FLO || align=right | 5.1 km || 
|-id=927 bgcolor=#E9E9E9
| 2927 Alamosa || 1981 TM ||  || October 5, 1981 || Anderson Mesa || N. G. Thomas || — || align=right | 11 km || 
|-id=928 bgcolor=#d6d6d6
| 2928 Epstein ||  ||  || April 5, 1976 || El Leoncito || Félix Aguilar Obs. || EOS || align=right | 15 km || 
|-id=929 bgcolor=#d6d6d6
| 2929 Harris ||  ||  || January 24, 1982 || Anderson Mesa || E. Bowell || — || align=right | 16 km || 
|-id=930 bgcolor=#E9E9E9
| 2930 Euripides || 6554 P-L ||  || September 24, 1960 || Palomar || PLS || HOF || align=right | 15 km || 
|-id=931 bgcolor=#d6d6d6
| 2931 Mayakovsky || 1969 UC ||  || October 16, 1969 || Nauchnij || L. I. Chernykh || KOR || align=right | 12 km || 
|-id=932 bgcolor=#d6d6d6
| 2932 Kempchinsky ||  ||  || October 9, 1980 || Palomar || C. S. Shoemaker || 7:4 || align=right | 29 km || 
|-id=933 bgcolor=#E9E9E9
| 2933 Amber || 1983 HN ||  || April 18, 1983 || Anderson Mesa || N. G. Thomas || — || align=right | 20 km || 
|-id=934 bgcolor=#d6d6d6
| 2934 Aristophanes || 4006 P-L ||  || September 25, 1960 || Palomar || PLS || VER || align=right | 22 km || 
|-id=935 bgcolor=#E9E9E9
| 2935 Naerum || 1976 UU ||  || October 24, 1976 || La Silla || R. M. West || — || align=right | 7.1 km || 
|-id=936 bgcolor=#E9E9E9
| 2936 Nechvíle || 1979 SF ||  || September 17, 1979 || Kleť || A. Mrkos || slow || align=right | 9.5 km || 
|-id=937 bgcolor=#FA8072
| 2937 Gibbs || 1980 LA ||  || June 14, 1980 || Anderson Mesa || E. Bowell || PHO || align=right | 5.0 km || 
|-id=938 bgcolor=#d6d6d6
| 2938 Hopi || 1980 LB ||  || June 14, 1980 || Anderson Mesa || E. Bowell || Tj (2.75) || align=right | 19 km || 
|-id=939 bgcolor=#fefefe
| 2939 Coconino || 1982 DP ||  || February 21, 1982 || Anderson Mesa || E. Bowell || — || align=right | 5.6 km || 
|-id=940 bgcolor=#E9E9E9
| 2940 Bacon || 3042 P-L ||  || September 24, 1960 || Palomar || PLS || DOR || align=right | 9.0 km || 
|-id=941 bgcolor=#fefefe
| 2941 Alden || 1930 YV ||  || December 24, 1930 || Flagstaff || C. W. Tombaugh || — || align=right | 4.8 km || 
|-id=942 bgcolor=#fefefe
| 2942 Cordie || 1932 BG ||  || January 29, 1932 || Heidelberg || K. Reinmuth || FLO || align=right | 6.7 km || 
|-id=943 bgcolor=#fefefe
| 2943 Heinrich || 1933 QU ||  || August 25, 1933 || Heidelberg || K. Reinmuth || — || align=right | 7.5 km || 
|-id=944 bgcolor=#E9E9E9
| 2944 Peyo || 1935 QF ||  || August 31, 1935 || Heidelberg || K. Reinmuth || — || align=right | 9.0 km || 
|-id=945 bgcolor=#E9E9E9
| 2945 Zanstra ||  ||  || September 28, 1935 || Johannesburg || H. van Gent || — || align=right | 24 km || 
|-id=946 bgcolor=#fefefe
| 2946 Muchachos || 1941 UV ||  || October 15, 1941 || Turku || L. Oterma || MAS || align=right | 13 km || 
|-id=947 bgcolor=#fefefe
| 2947 Kippenhahn ||  ||  || August 22, 1955 || Heidelberg || I. van Houten-Groeneveld || — || align=right | 7.6 km || 
|-id=948 bgcolor=#d6d6d6
| 2948 Amosov ||  ||  || October 8, 1969 || Nauchnij || L. I. Chernykh || — || align=right | 10 km || 
|-id=949 bgcolor=#fefefe
| 2949 Kaverznev || 1970 PR ||  || August 9, 1970 || Nauchnij || Crimean Astrophysical Obs. || — || align=right | 7.0 km || 
|-id=950 bgcolor=#E9E9E9
| 2950 Rousseau ||  ||  || November 9, 1974 || Zimmerwald || P. Wild || — || align=right | 10 km || 
|-id=951 bgcolor=#d6d6d6
| 2951 Perepadin ||  ||  || September 13, 1977 || Nauchnij || N. S. Chernykh || — || align=right | 47 km || 
|-id=952 bgcolor=#fefefe
| 2952 Lilliputia ||  ||  || September 22, 1979 || Nauchnij || N. S. Chernykh || — || align=right | 6.0 km || 
|-id=953 bgcolor=#d6d6d6
| 2953 Vysheslavia ||  ||  || September 24, 1979 || Nauchnij || N. S. Chernykh || KOR || align=right | 13 km || 
|-id=954 bgcolor=#fefefe
| 2954 Delsemme ||  ||  || January 30, 1982 || Anderson Mesa || E. Bowell || — || align=right | 5.3 km || 
|-id=955 bgcolor=#fefefe
| 2955 Newburn ||  ||  || January 30, 1982 || Anderson Mesa || E. Bowell || — || align=right | 5.4 km || 
|-id=956 bgcolor=#E9E9E9
| 2956 Yeomans ||  ||  || April 28, 1982 || Anderson Mesa || E. Bowell || — || align=right | 9.4 km || 
|-id=957 bgcolor=#d6d6d6
| 2957 Tatsuo ||  ||  || February 5, 1934 || Heidelberg || K. Reinmuth || EOS || align=right | 22 km || 
|-id=958 bgcolor=#d6d6d6
| 2958 Arpetito || 1981 DG ||  || February 28, 1981 || La Silla || H. Debehogne, G. DeSanctis || KOR || align=right | 8.9 km || 
|-id=959 bgcolor=#d6d6d6
| 2959 Scholl ||  ||  || September 4, 1983 || Anderson Mesa || E. Bowell || 3:2 || align=right | 33 km || 
|-id=960 bgcolor=#fefefe
| 2960 Ohtaki ||  ||  || February 18, 1977 || Kiso || H. Kosai, K. Furukawa || — || align=right | 5.3 km || 
|-id=961 bgcolor=#fefefe
| 2961 Katsurahama || 1982 XA ||  || December 7, 1982 || Geisei || T. Seki || FLO || align=right | 5.7 km || 
|-id=962 bgcolor=#E9E9E9
| 2962 Otto || 1940 YF ||  || December 28, 1940 || Turku || Y. Väisälä || MAR || align=right | 17 km || 
|-id=963 bgcolor=#d6d6d6
| 2963 Chen Jiageng ||  ||  || November 9, 1964 || Nanking || Purple Mountain Obs. || KAR || align=right | 9.5 km || 
|-id=964 bgcolor=#E9E9E9
| 2964 Jaschek ||  ||  || July 16, 1974 || El Leoncito || Félix Aguilar Obs. || — || align=right | 7.9 km || 
|-id=965 bgcolor=#fefefe
| 2965 Surikov || 1975 BX ||  || January 18, 1975 || Nauchnij || L. I. Chernykh || — || align=right | 8.7 km || 
|-id=966 bgcolor=#fefefe
| 2966 Korsunia ||  ||  || March 13, 1977 || Nauchnij || N. S. Chernykh || — || align=right | 5.9 km || 
|-id=967 bgcolor=#d6d6d6
| 2967 Vladisvyat ||  ||  || September 19, 1977 || Nauchnij || N. S. Chernykh || URS || align=right | 33 km || 
|-id=968 bgcolor=#FA8072
| 2968 Iliya || 1978 QJ ||  || August 31, 1978 || Nauchnij || N. S. Chernykh || — || align=right | 4.5 km || 
|-id=969 bgcolor=#d6d6d6
| 2969 Mikula ||  ||  || September 5, 1978 || Nauchnij || N. S. Chernykh || KOR || align=right | 8.3 km || 
|-id=970 bgcolor=#E9E9E9
| 2970 Pestalozzi || 1978 UC ||  || October 27, 1978 || Zimmerwald || P. Wild || EUN || align=right | 6.9 km || 
|-id=971 bgcolor=#fefefe
| 2971 Mohr || 1980 YL ||  || December 30, 1980 || Kleť || A. Mrkos || FLO || align=right | 5.2 km || 
|-id=972 bgcolor=#fefefe
| 2972 Niilo || 1939 TB ||  || October 7, 1939 || Turku || Y. Väisälä || — || align=right | 4.7 km || 
|-id=973 bgcolor=#fefefe
| 2973 Paola || 1951 AJ ||  || January 10, 1951 || Uccle || S. Arend || NYS || align=right | 12 km || 
|-id=974 bgcolor=#fefefe
| 2974 Holden || 1955 QK ||  || August 23, 1955 || Brooklyn || Indiana University || Vslow || align=right | 5.9 km || 
|-id=975 bgcolor=#fefefe
| 2975 Spahr ||  ||  || January 8, 1970 || Cerro El Roble || H. Potter, A. Lokalov || — || align=right | 5.9 km || 
|-id=976 bgcolor=#d6d6d6
| 2976 Lautaro || 1974 HR ||  || April 22, 1974 || Cerro El Roble || C. Torres || SYL7:4 || align=right | 46 km || 
|-id=977 bgcolor=#E9E9E9
| 2977 Chivilikhin || 1974 SP ||  || September 19, 1974 || Nauchnij || L. I. Chernykh || GEF || align=right | 9.1 km || 
|-id=978 bgcolor=#d6d6d6
| 2978 Roudebush || 1978 SR ||  || September 26, 1978 || Harvard Observatory || Harvard Obs. || THM || align=right | 19 km || 
|-id=979 bgcolor=#d6d6d6
| 2979 Murmansk ||  ||  || October 2, 1978 || Nauchnij || L. V. Zhuravleva || — || align=right | 21 km || 
|-id=980 bgcolor=#E9E9E9
| 2980 Cameron ||  ||  || March 2, 1981 || Siding Spring || S. J. Bus || RAF || align=right | 5.1 km || 
|-id=981 bgcolor=#d6d6d6
| 2981 Chagall ||  ||  || March 2, 1981 || Siding Spring || S. J. Bus || THM || align=right | 15 km || 
|-id=982 bgcolor=#d6d6d6
| 2982 Muriel ||  ||  || May 6, 1981 || Palomar || C. S. Shoemaker || EOS || align=right | 15 km || 
|-id=983 bgcolor=#d6d6d6
| 2983 Poltava ||  ||  || September 2, 1981 || Nauchnij || N. S. Chernykh || — || align=right | 31 km || 
|-id=984 bgcolor=#fefefe
| 2984 Chaucer || 1981 YD ||  || December 30, 1981 || Anderson Mesa || E. Bowell || — || align=right | 15 km || 
|-id=985 bgcolor=#d6d6d6
| 2985 Shakespeare ||  ||  || October 12, 1983 || Anderson Mesa || E. Bowell || KOR || align=right | 10 km || 
|-id=986 bgcolor=#d6d6d6
| 2986 Mrinalini || 2525 P-L ||  || September 24, 1960 || Palomar || PLS || — || align=right | 19 km || 
|-id=987 bgcolor=#d6d6d6
| 2987 Sarabhai || 4583 P-L ||  || September 24, 1960 || Palomar || PLS || — || align=right | 18 km || 
|-id=988 bgcolor=#E9E9E9
| 2988 Korhonen || 1943 EM ||  || March 1, 1943 || Turku || L. Oterma || EUN || align=right | 14 km || 
|-id=989 bgcolor=#fefefe
| 2989 Imago ||  ||  || October 22, 1976 || Zimmerwald || P. Wild || — || align=right | 6.0 km || 
|-id=990 bgcolor=#fefefe
| 2990 Trimberger ||  ||  || March 2, 1981 || Siding Spring || S. J. Bus || NYS || align=right | 11 km || 
|-id=991 bgcolor=#fefefe
| 2991 Bilbo || 1982 HV ||  || April 21, 1982 || Anderson Mesa || M. Watt || — || align=right | 7.8 km || 
|-id=992 bgcolor=#E9E9E9
| 2992 Vondel || 2540 P-L ||  || September 24, 1960 || Palomar || PLS || — || align=right | 11 km || 
|-id=993 bgcolor=#E9E9E9
| 2993 Wendy || 1970 PA ||  || August 4, 1970 || Bickley || Perth Obs. || EUN || align=right | 11 km || 
|-id=994 bgcolor=#fefefe
| 2994 Flynn || 1975 PA ||  || August 14, 1975 || Bickley || Perth Obs. || NYS || align=right | 4.1 km || 
|-id=995 bgcolor=#E9E9E9
| 2995 Taratuta || 1978 QK ||  || August 31, 1978 || Nauchnij || N. S. Chernykh || — || align=right | 17 km || 
|-id=996 bgcolor=#E9E9E9
| 2996 Bowman || 1954 RJ ||  || September 5, 1954 || Brooklyn || Indiana University || HOF || align=right | 20 km || 
|-id=997 bgcolor=#E9E9E9
| 2997 Cabrera || 1974 MJ ||  || June 17, 1974 || El Leoncito || Félix Aguilar Obs. || — || align=right | 8.3 km || 
|-id=998 bgcolor=#fefefe
| 2998 Berendeya ||  ||  || October 3, 1975 || Nauchnij || L. I. Chernykh || NYS || align=right | 4.3 km || 
|-id=999 bgcolor=#fefefe
| 2999 Dante || 1981 CY ||  || February 6, 1981 || Anderson Mesa || N. G. Thomas || FLO || align=right | 6.9 km || 
|-id=000 bgcolor=#fefefe
| 3000 Leonardo ||  ||  || March 2, 1981 || Siding Spring || S. J. Bus || — || align=right | 9.8 km || 
|}

References

External links 
 Discovery Circumstances: Numbered Minor Planets (1)–(5000) (IAU Minor Planet Center)

0002